= 20th-century Western painting =

Art in the Western world during the 20th century

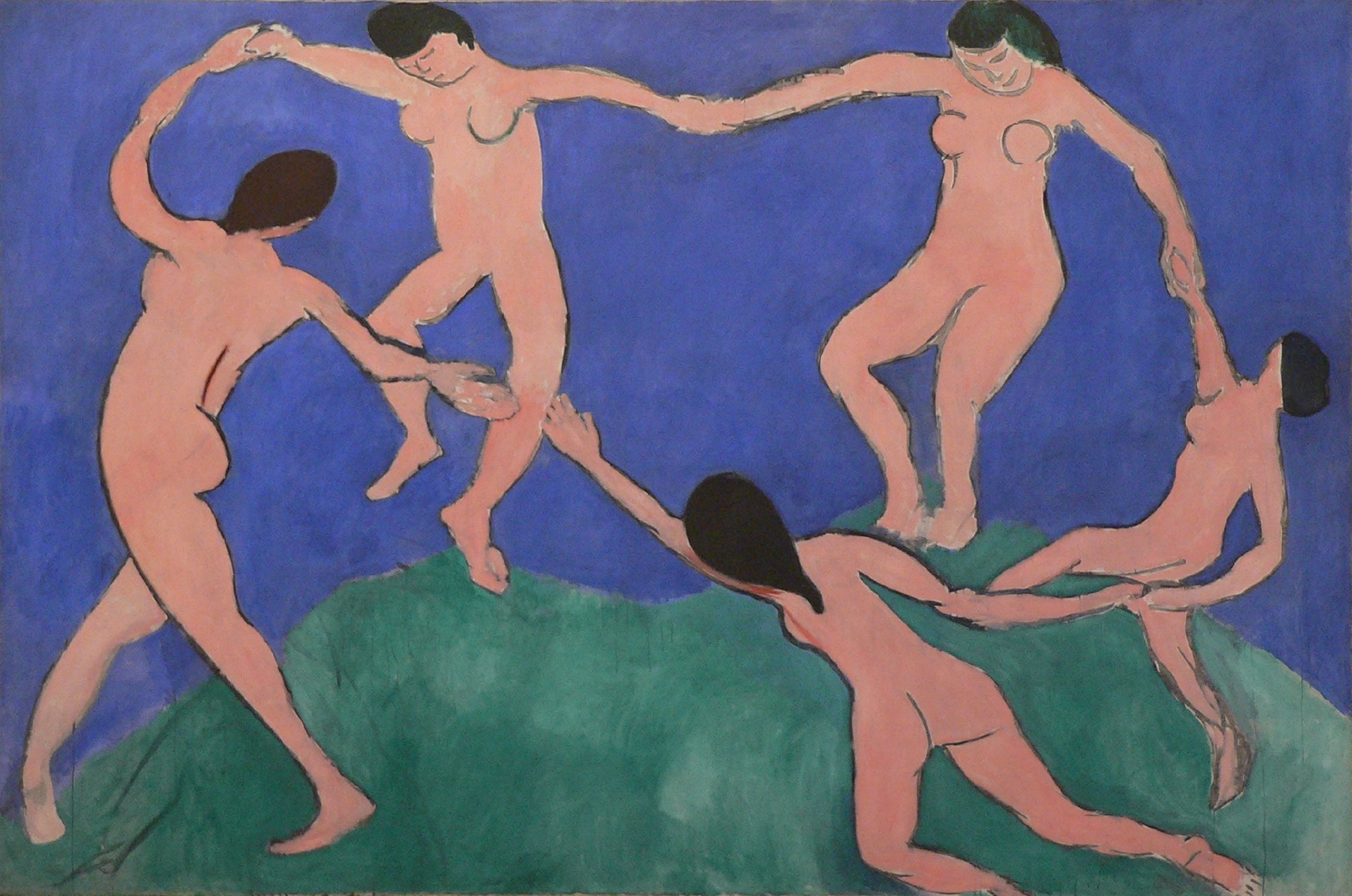
Henri Matisse, The Dance I, 1909, Museum of Modern Art. One of the cornerstones of 20th-century modern art.

20th-century Western painting begins with the heritage of late-19th-century painters Vincent van Gogh, Paul Cézanne, Paul Gauguin, Georges Seurat, Henri de Toulouse-Lautrec, and others who were essential for the development of modern art. At the beginning of the 20th century, Henri Matisse and several other young artists including the pre-cubist Georges Braque, André Derain, Raoul Dufy and Maurice de Vlaminck, revolutionized the Paris art world with "wild", multi-colored, expressive landscapes and figure paintings that the critics called Fauvism. Matisse's second version of The Dance signified a key point in his career and in the development of modern painting. It reflected Matisse's incipient fascination with primitive art: the intense warm color of the figures against the cool blue-green background and the rhythmical succession of the dancing nudes convey the feelings of emotional liberation and hedonism.

Initially influenced by Toulouse-Lautrec, Gauguin, and other late-19th-century innovators, Pablo Picasso made his first cubist paintings based on Cézanne's idea that all depiction of nature can be reduced to three solids: cube, sphere, and cone. With the painting Les Demoiselles d'Avignon (1907; see gallery) Picasso created a new and radical picture depicting a raw and primitive brothel scene with five prostitutes, violently painted women, reminiscent of African tribal masks and his own new proto-Cubist inventions. Analytic cubism, exemplified by Violin and Candlestick, Paris, was jointly developed by Pablo Picasso and Georges Braque from about 1908 through 1912. Analytic cubism was followed by Synthetic cubism, characterized by the introduction of different textures, surfaces, collage elements, papier collé and a large variety of merged subject matter.

Crystal Cubism was a distilled form of Cubism consistent with a shift between 1915 and 1916 towards a strong emphasis on flat surface activity and large overlapping geometric planes, practised by Braque, Picasso, Jean Metzinger, Albert Gleizes, Juan Gris, Diego Rivera, Henri Laurens, Jacques Lipchitz, Alexander Archipenko, Fernand Léger, and several other artists into the 1920s.

During the years between 1910 and the end of World War I and after the heyday of cubism, several movements emerged in Paris. Giorgio de Chirico moved to Paris in July 1911, where he joined his brother Andrea (the poet and painter known as Alberto Savinio). Through his brother he met Pierre Laprade, a member of the jury at the Salon d'Automne, where he exhibited three of his dreamlike works: Enigma of the Oracle, Enigma of an Afternoon and Self-Portrait. During 1913 he exhibited his work at the Salon des Indépendants and Salon d’Automne, where his work was noticed by Pablo Picasso, Guillaume Apollinaire, and others. His compelling and mysterious paintings are considered instrumental to the early beginnings of Surrealism. Song of Love (1914) is one of the most famous works by de Chirico and is an early example of the surrealist style, though it was painted ten years before the movement was "founded" by André Breton in 1924.

In the first two decades of the 20th century, as Cubism evolved, several other important movements emerged; Futurism (Giacomo Balla), Abstract art (Wassily Kandinsky), Der Blaue Reiter (Kandinsky and Franz Marc), Bauhaus (Kandinsky and Paul Klee), Orphism, (Robert Delaunay and František Kupka), Synchromism (Morgan Russell and Stanton Macdonald-Wright), De Stijl (Theo van Doesburg and Piet Mondrian), Suprematism (Kazimir Malevich), Constructivism (Vladimir Tatlin), Dadaism (Marcel Duchamp, Picabia and Jean Arp), and Surrealism (Giorgio de Chirico, André Breton, Joan Miró, René Magritte, Salvador Dalí and Max Ernst). Modern painting influenced all the visual arts, from Modernist architecture and design, to avant-garde film, theatre and modern dance, and became an experimental laboratory for the expression of visual experience, from photography and concrete poetry to advertising art and fashion. Van Gogh's paintings exerted great influence upon 20th-century Expressionism, as can be seen in the work of the Fauves, Die Brücke (a group led by German painter Ernst Kirchner), and the Expressionism of Edvard Munch, Egon Schiele, Marc Chagall, Amedeo Modigliani, Chaïm Soutine, and others.

== Early 20th century ==
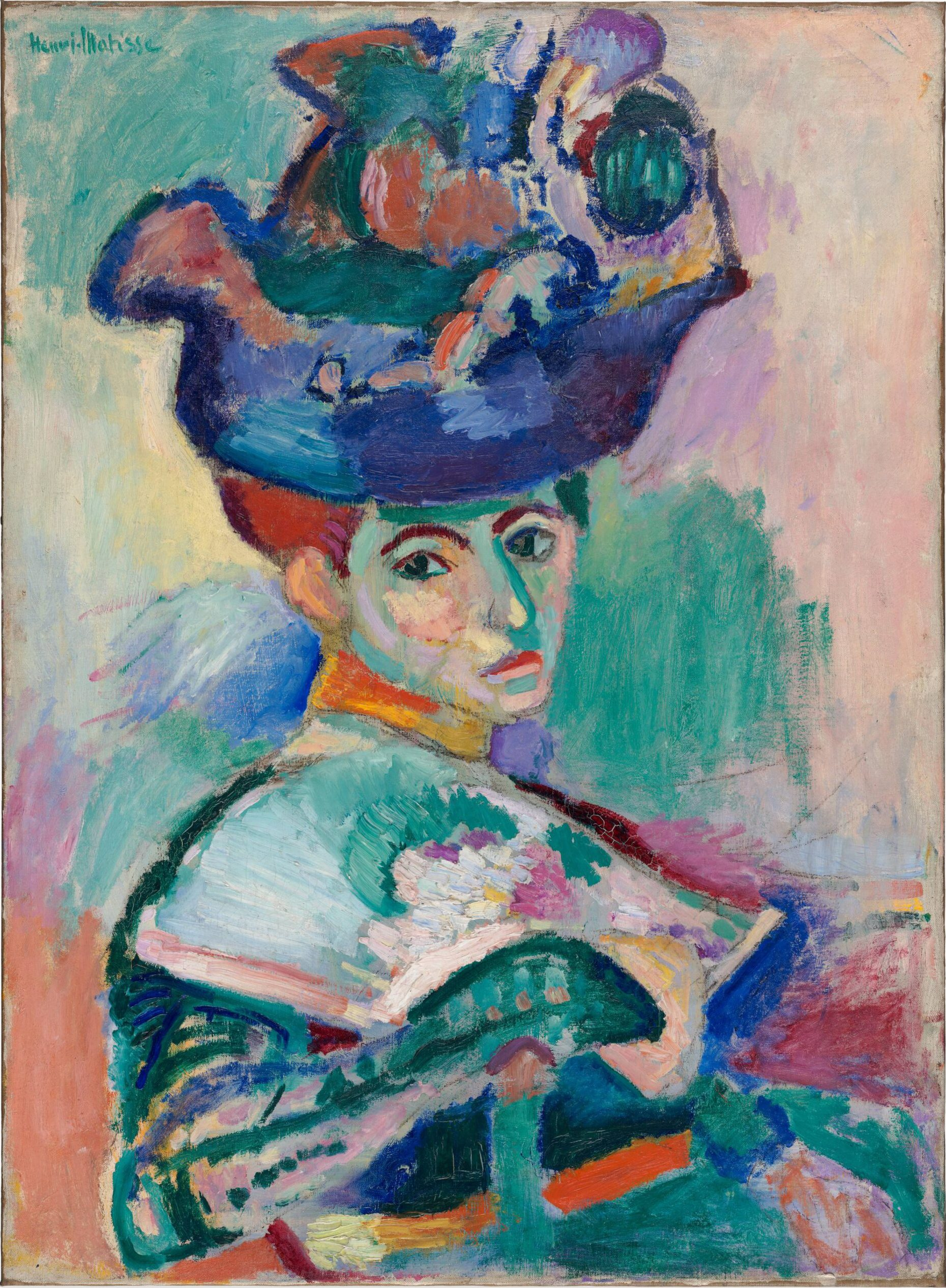
Henri Matisse, 1905, Fauvism

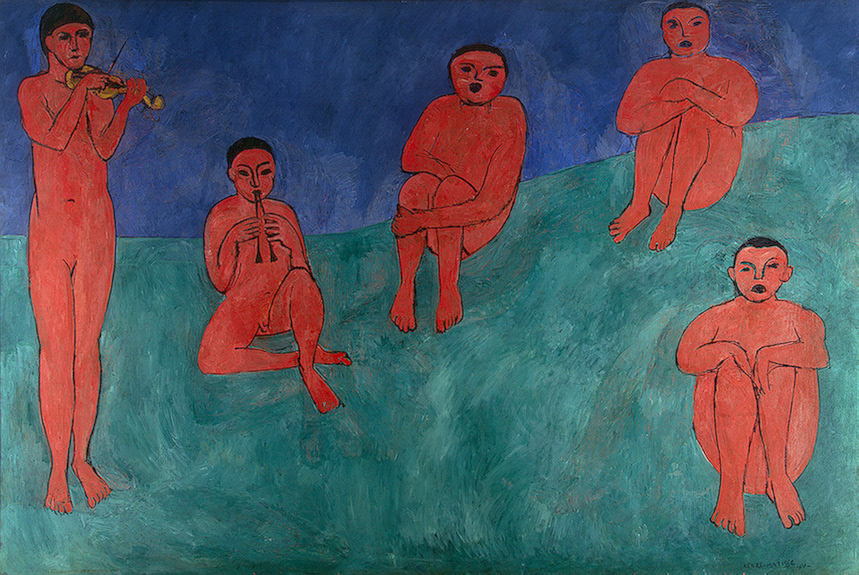
Henri Matisse, Music, 1910, late Fauvism

Pablo Picasso, 1907, early Cubism

Georges Braque, 1910, Analytic Cubism

Giorgio de Chirico, 1914, Metaphysical art (pre-Surrealism)

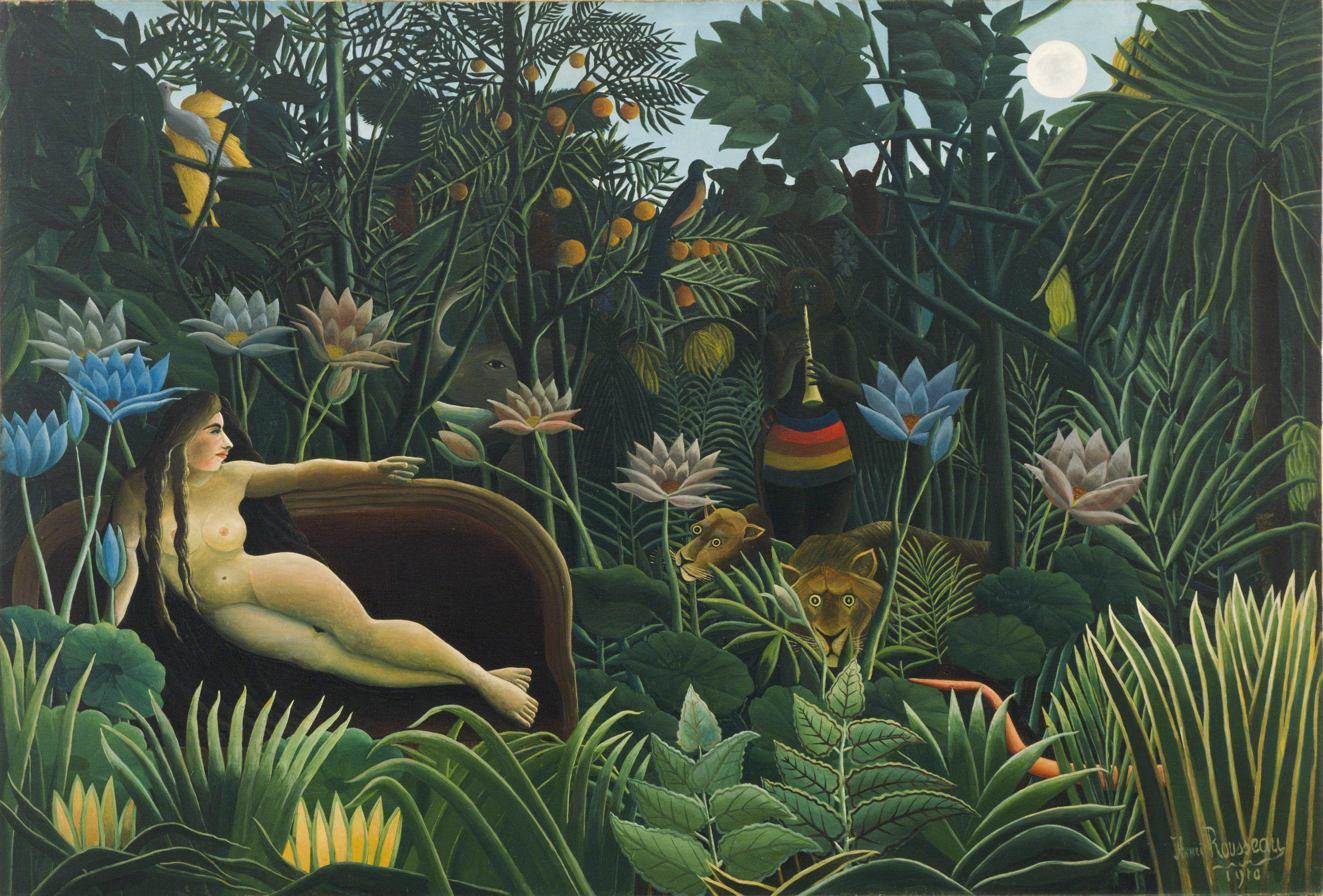
Henri Rousseau, The Dream, 1910, Primitive Surrealism

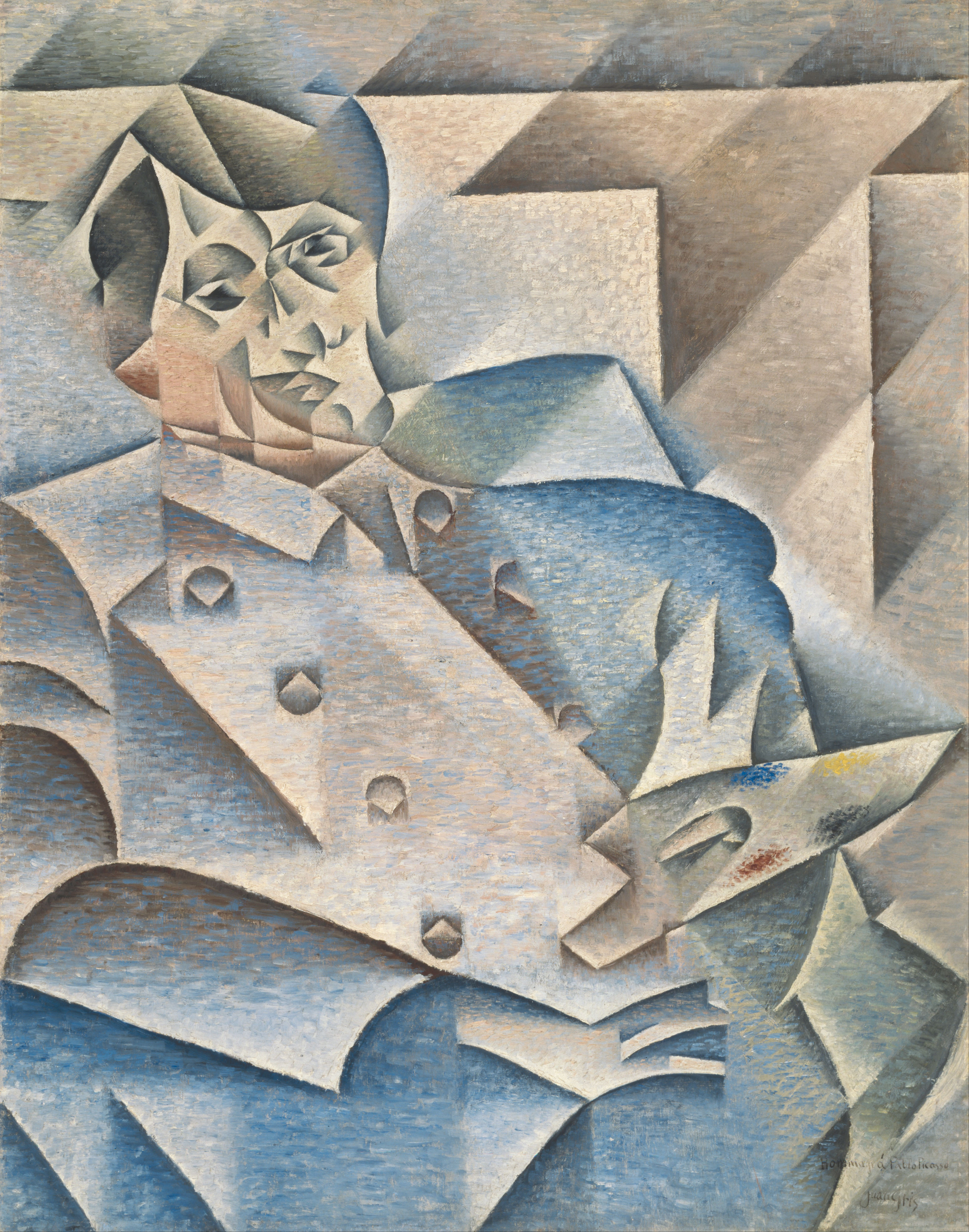
Juan Gris, 1912, Cubism

František Kupka, Amorpha, Fugue in Two Colors, 1912, Orphism

=== Pioneers of abstraction ===
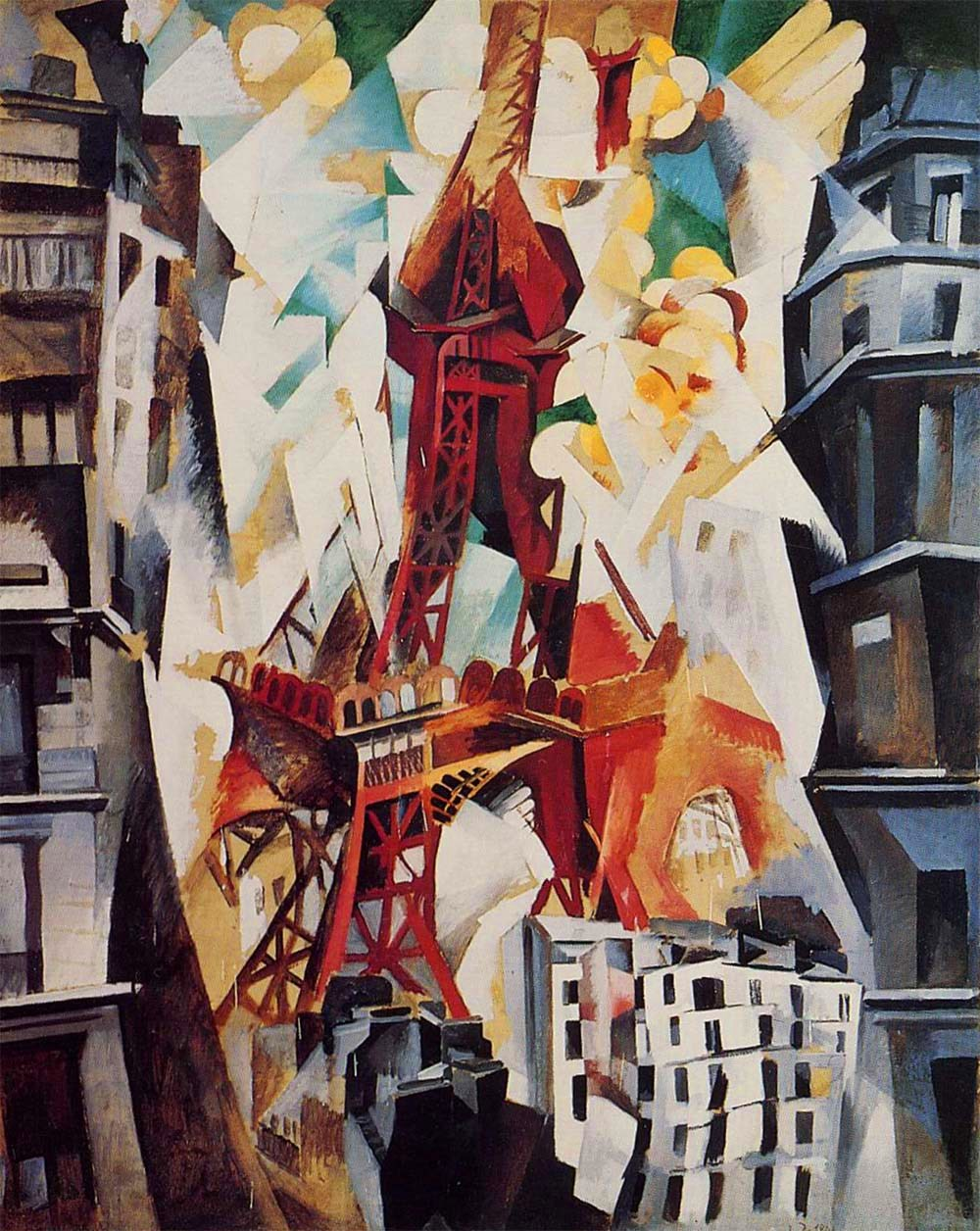
Robert Delaunay, 1911, Orphism

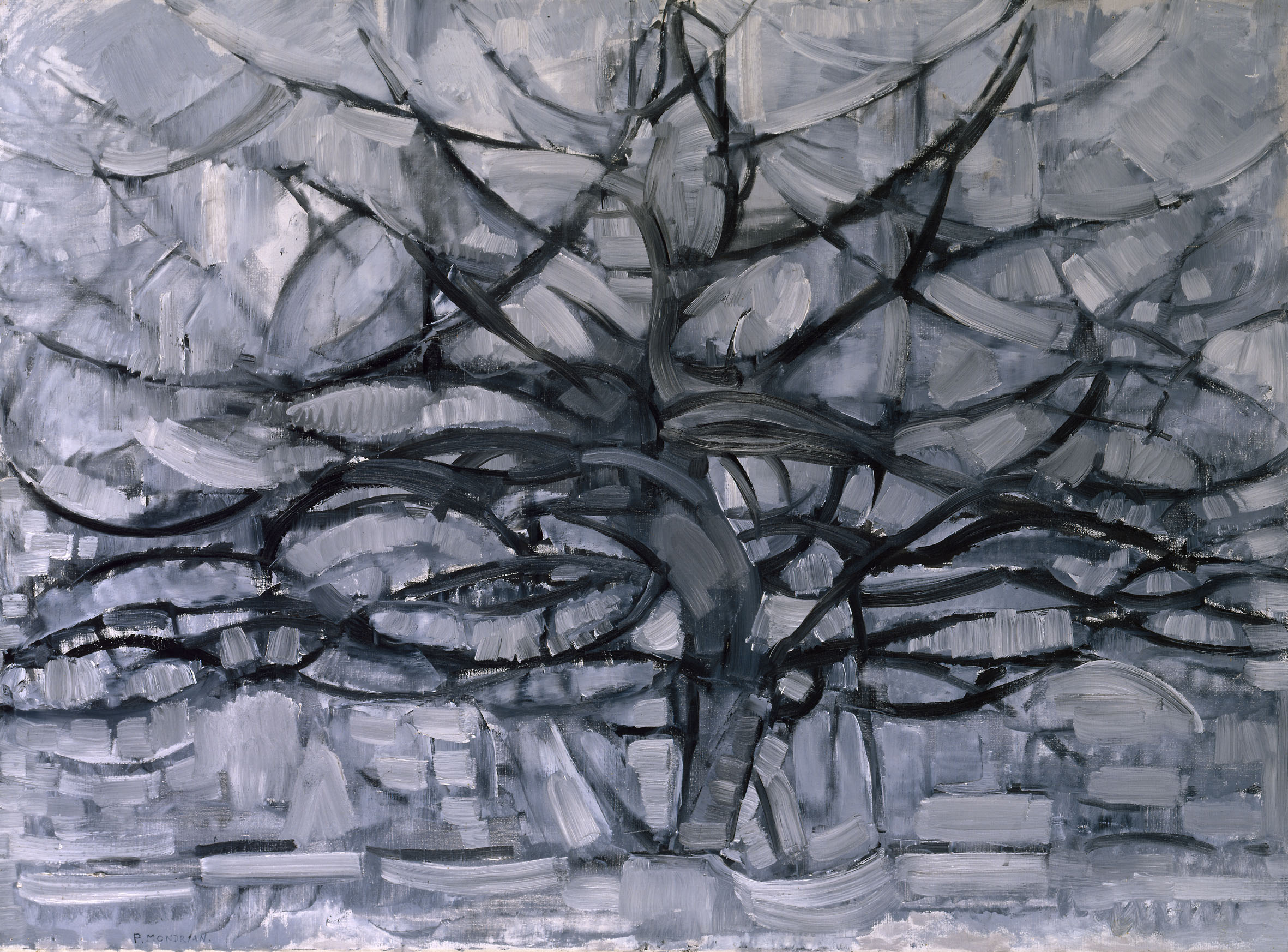
Piet Mondrian, 1911, early De Stijl

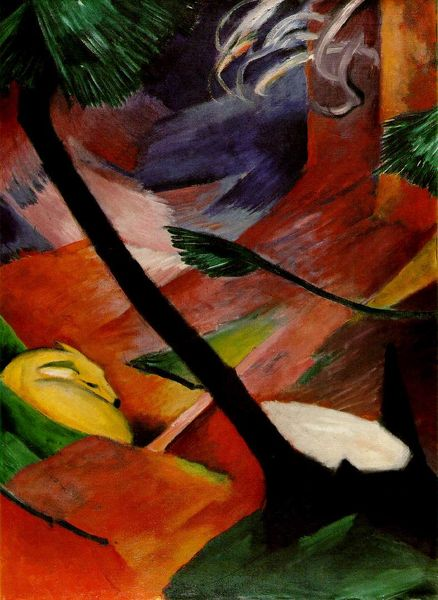
Franz Marc 1912, Der Blaue Reiter

Marcel Duchamp, 1911–1912, Cubism and Dada

Wassily Kandinsky, 1913, birth of Abstract Art

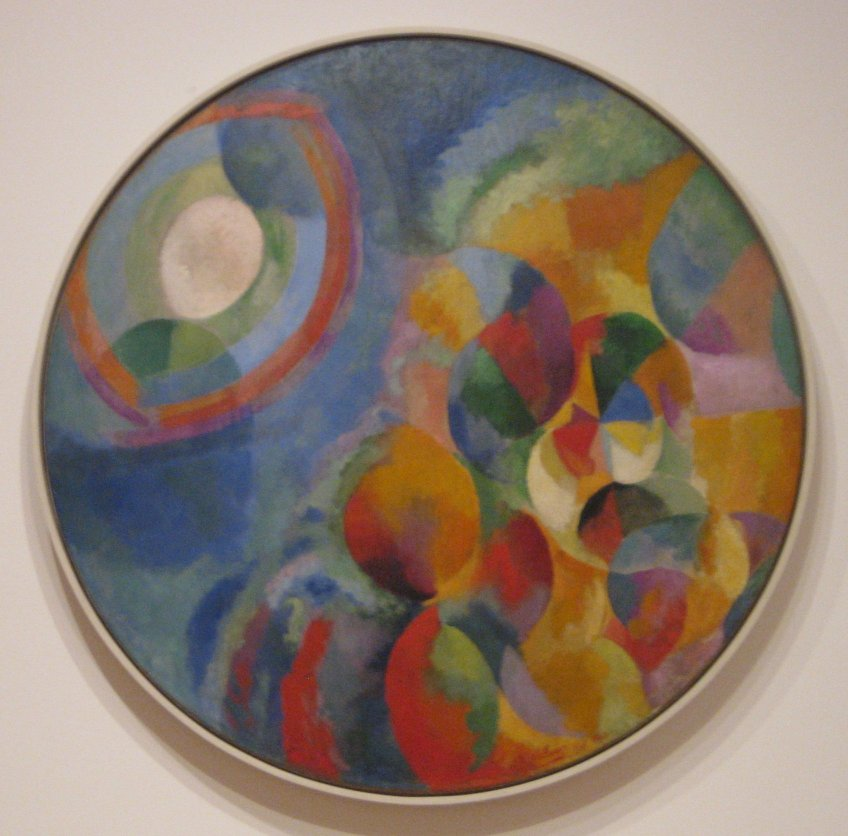
Robert Delaunay, 1912–1913, Orphism

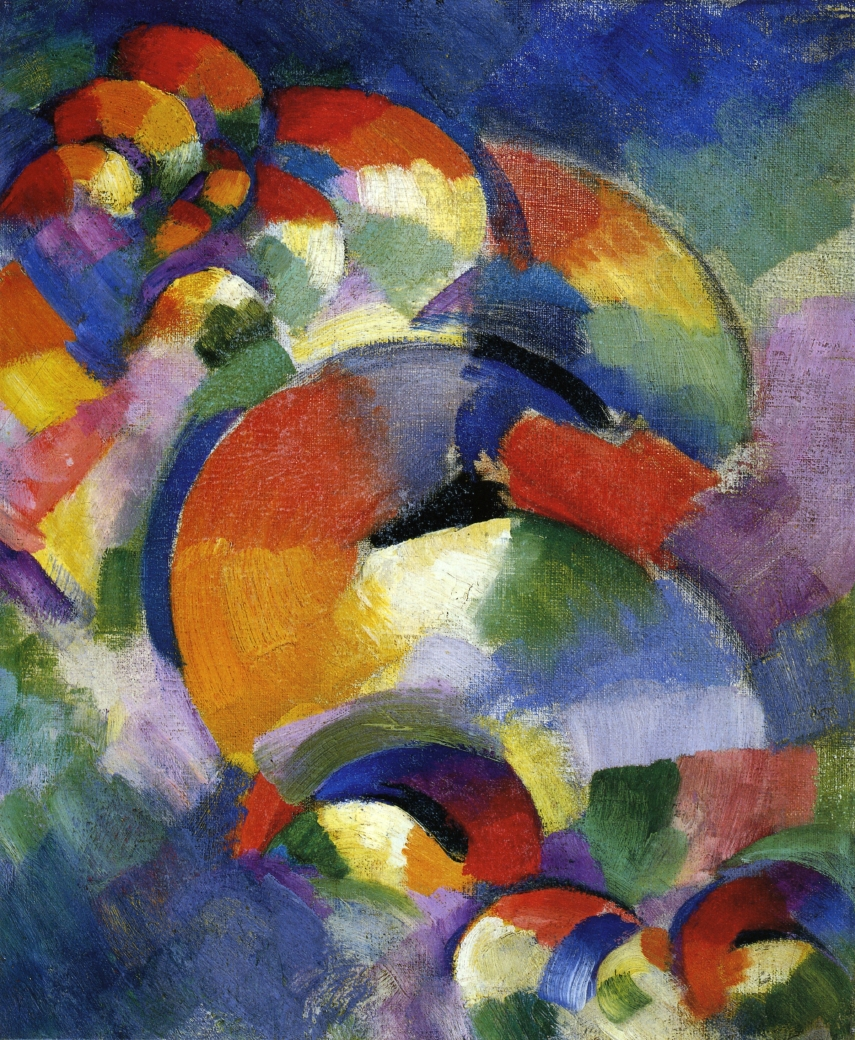
Morgan Russell, 1913–14 Synchromism

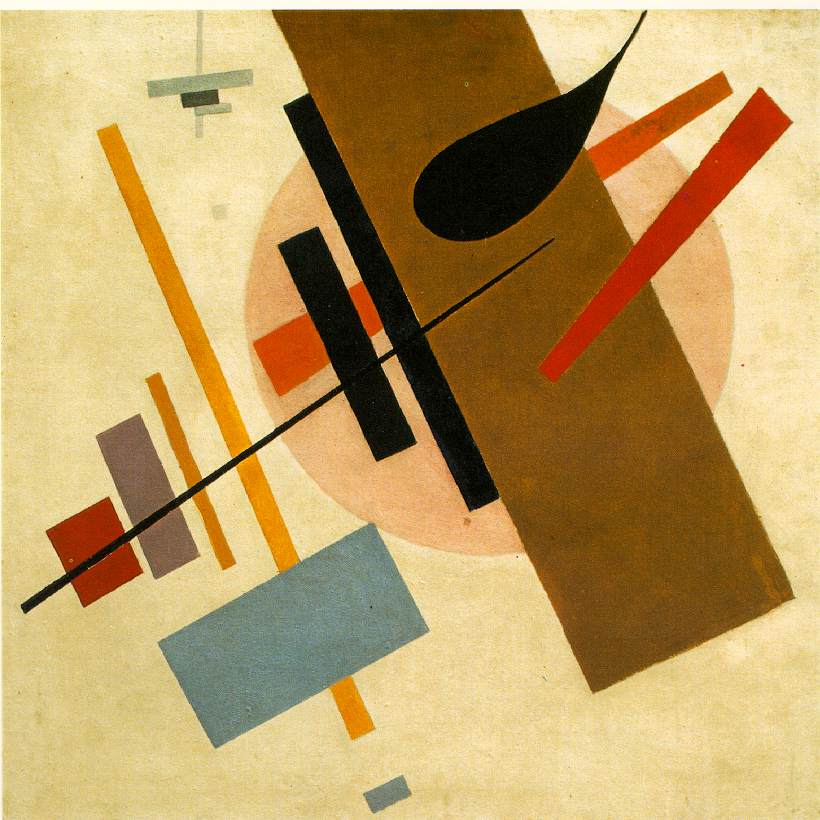
Kazimir Malevich, 1916, Suprematism

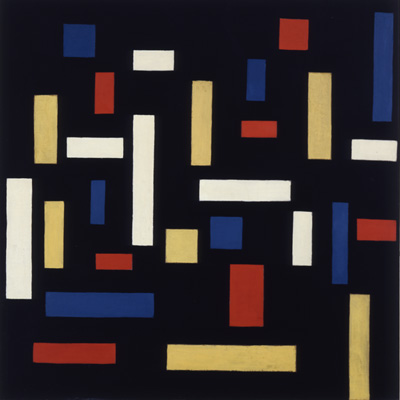
Theo van Doesburg, 1917, De Stijl, Neo-Plasticism

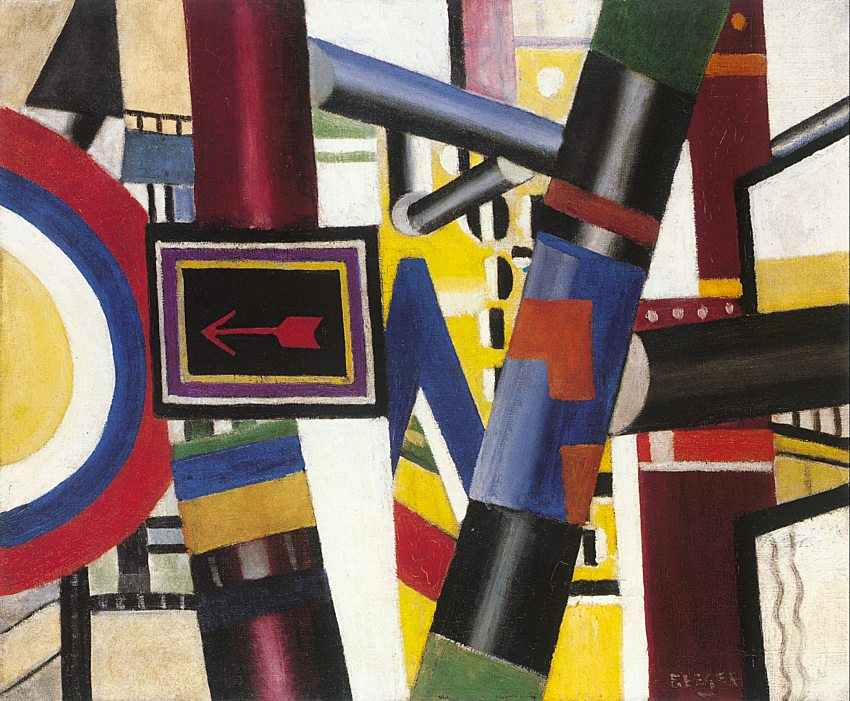
Fernand Léger, 1919, Synthetic Cubism, Tubism

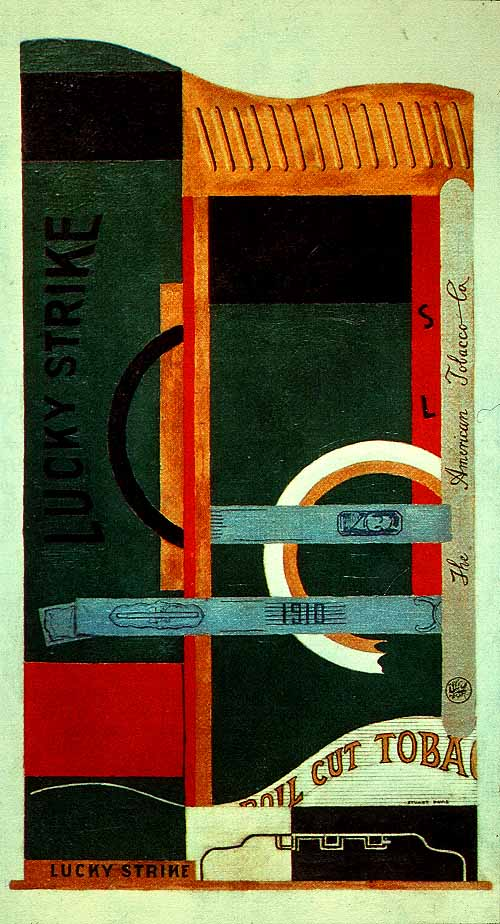
Stuart Davis, American modernism, 1921

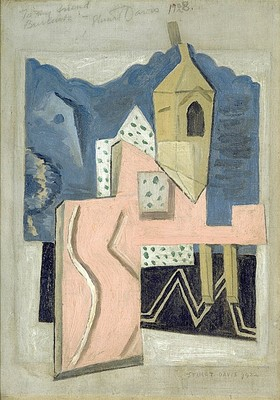
Stuart Davis American Modernism 1922

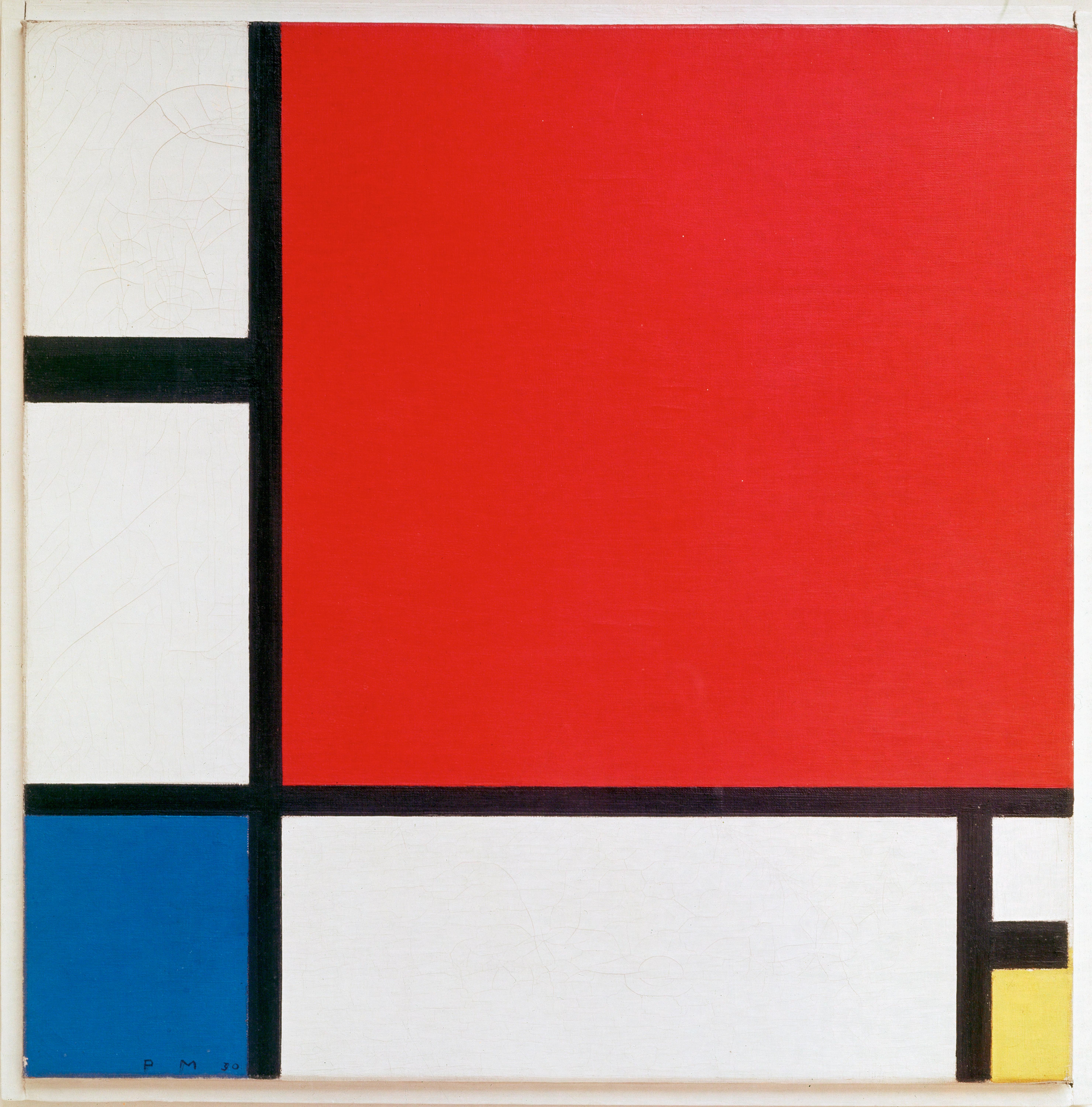
Piet Mondrian, Composition II in Red, Blue, and Yellow, 1930, De Stijl

Wassily Kandinsky, a Russian painter, printmaker and art theorist, is generally considered the first important painter of modern abstract art. As an early modernist, in search of new modes of visual expression, and spiritual expression, he theorized—as did contemporary occultists and theosophists—that pure visual abstraction had corollary vibrations with sound and music. They posited that pure abstraction could express pure spirituality. His earliest abstractions were generally titled (as the example in the above gallery) Composition VII, making connection to the work of the composers of music. Kandinsky included many of his theories about abstract art in his book Concerning the Spiritual in Art. Piet Mondrian's art was also related to his spiritual and philosophical studies. In 1908 he became interested in the theosophical movement launched by Helena Petrovna Blavatsky in the late 19th century. Blavatsky believed that it was possible to attain a knowledge of nature more profound than that provided by empirical means, and much of Mondrian's work for the rest of his life was inspired by his search for that spiritual knowledge. Other major pioneers of early abstraction include Swedish painter Hilma af Klint, Russian painter Kazimir Malevich, and Swiss painter Paul Klee. Robert Delaunay was a French artist who is associated with Orphism, (reminiscent of a link between pure abstraction and cubism). His later works were more abstract, reminiscent of Paul Klee. His key contributions to abstract painting refer to his bold use of color, and a clear love of experimentation of both depth and tone. At the invitation of Kandinsky, Delaunay and his wife the artist Sonia Delaunay, joined The Blue Rider (Der Blaue Reiter), a Munich-based group of abstract artists, in 1911, and his art took a turn to the abstract. Still other important pioneers of abstract painting include Czech painter, František Kupka as well as American artists Stanton Macdonald-Wright and Morgan Russell who, in 1912, founded Synchromism, an art movement that closely resembles Orphism.

=== Fauvism, Der Blaue Reiter, Die Brücke ===
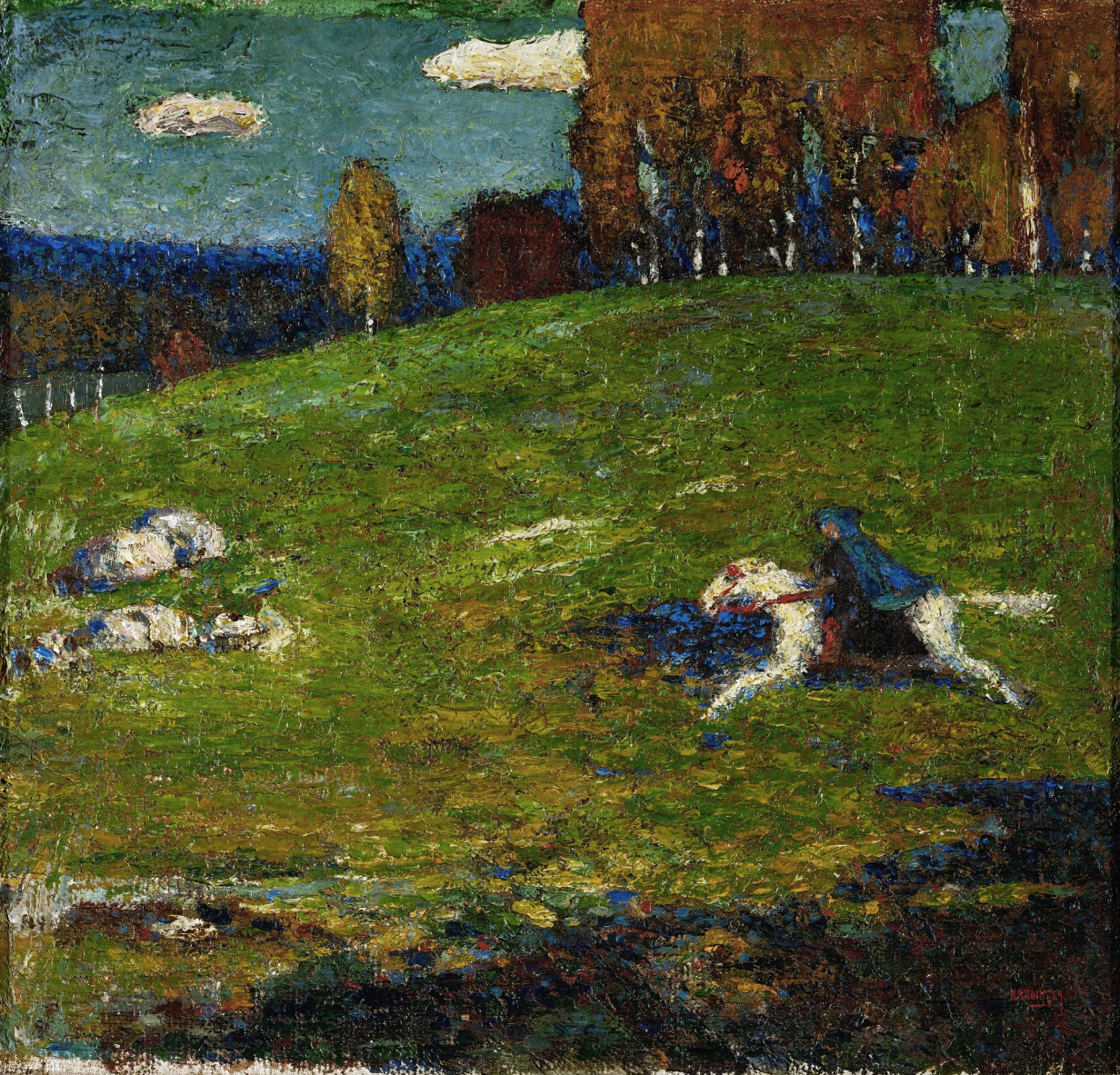
Wassily Kandinsky, Der Blaue Reiter, 1903

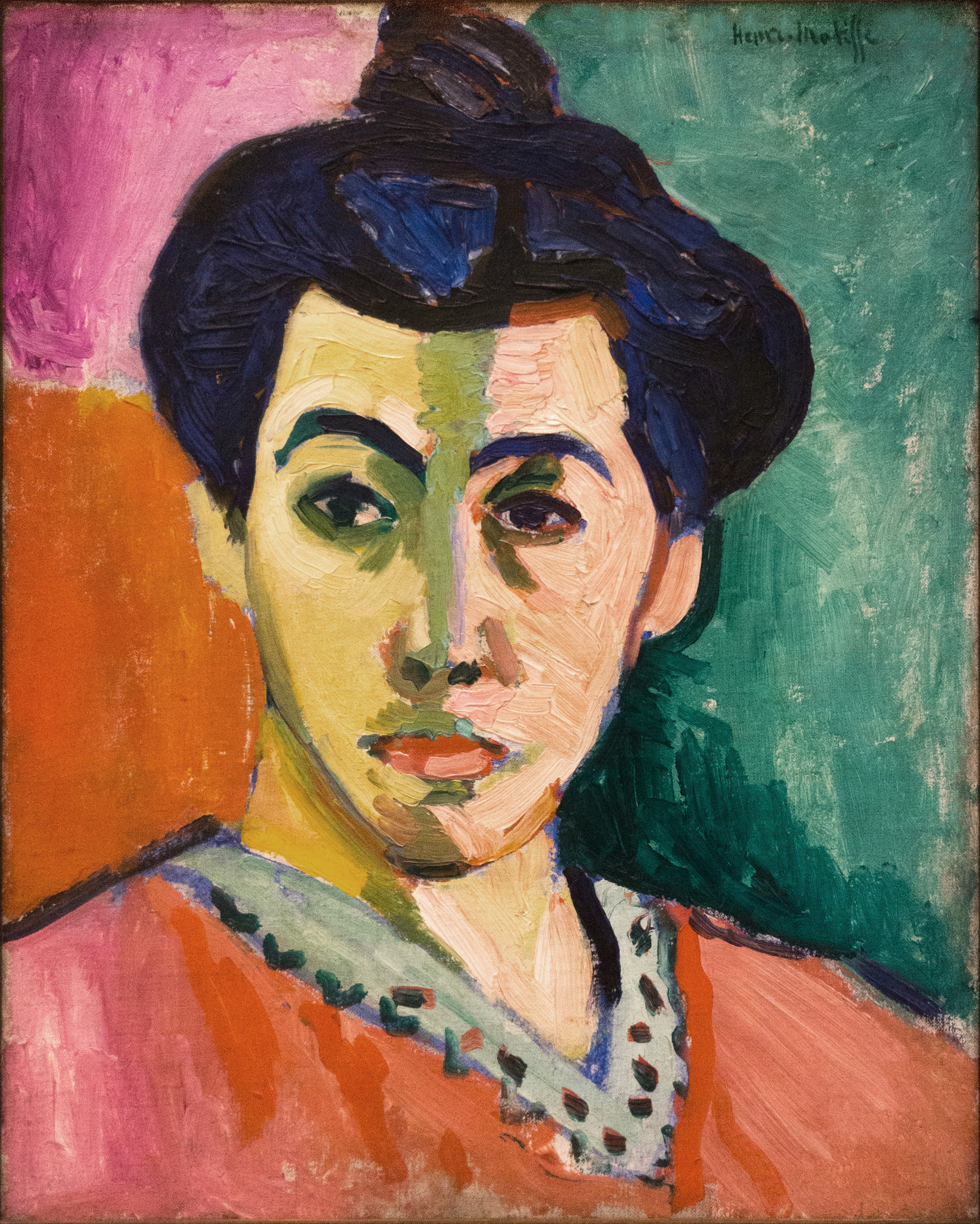
Henri Matisse, Fauvism, 1905

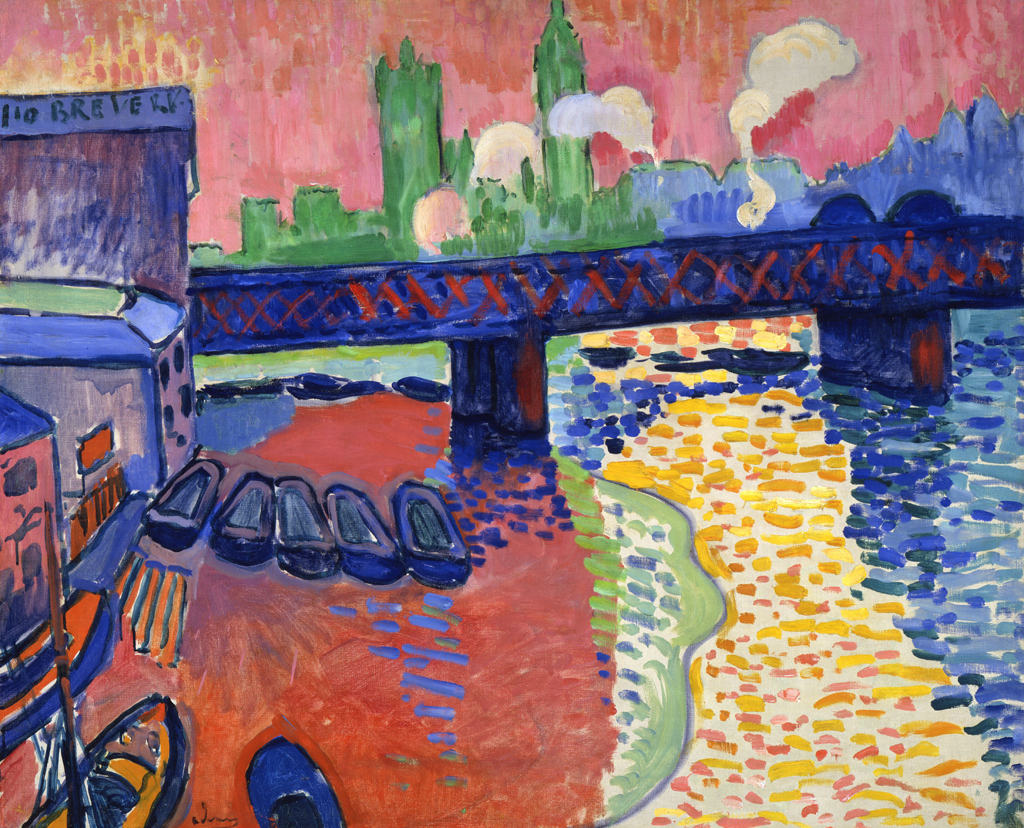
André Derain, Fauvism, 1906

Maurice de Vlaminck, Fauvism, 1906

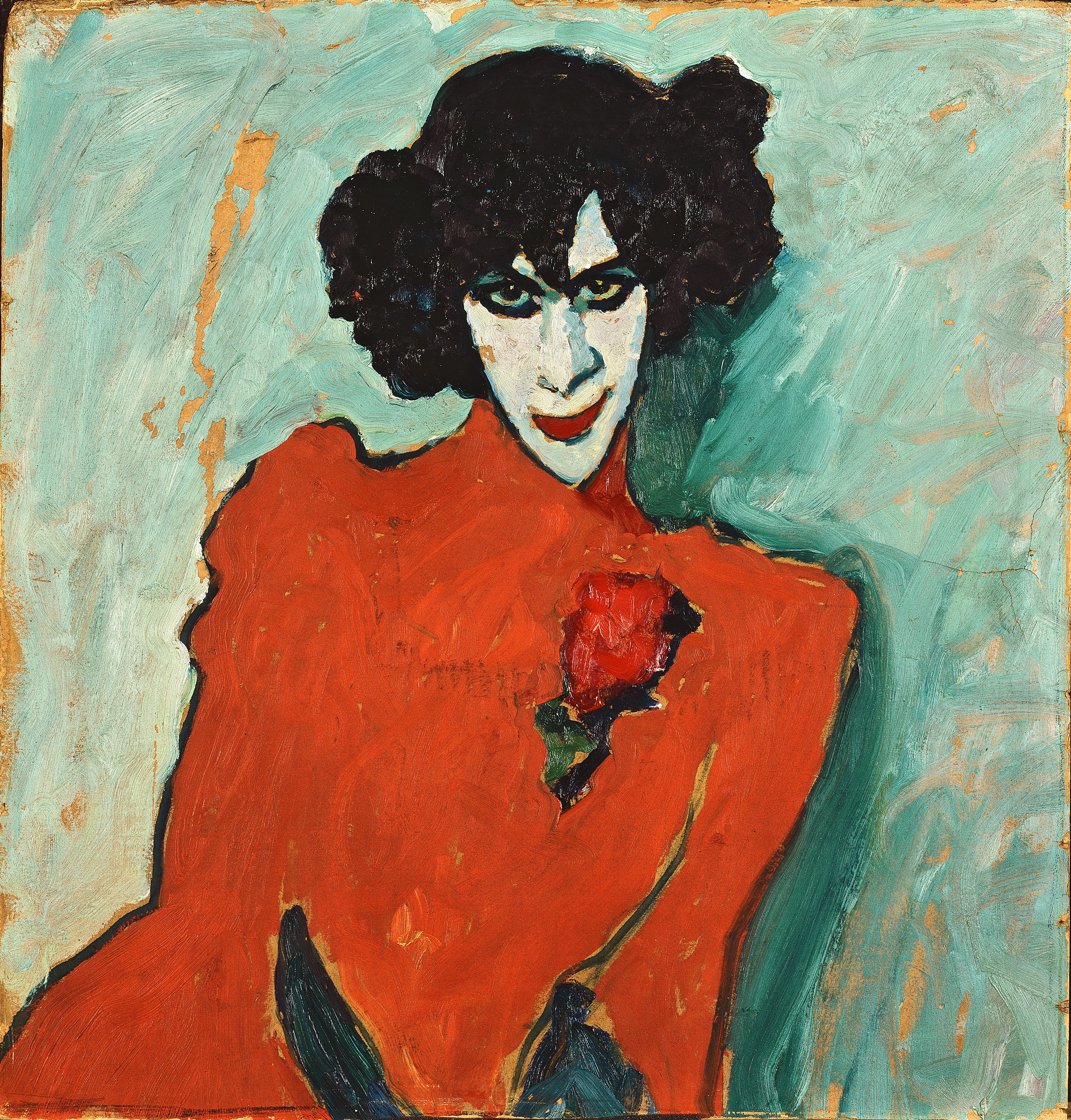
Alexej von Jawlensky, Der Blaue Reiter, 1909

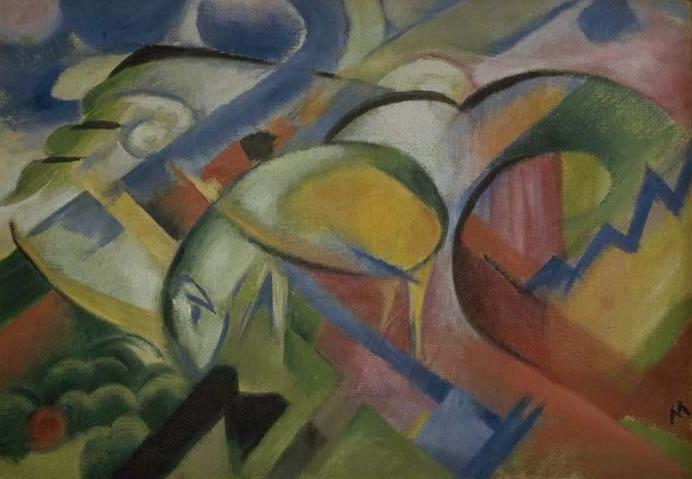
Franz Marc, Der Blaue Reiter, 1913–14

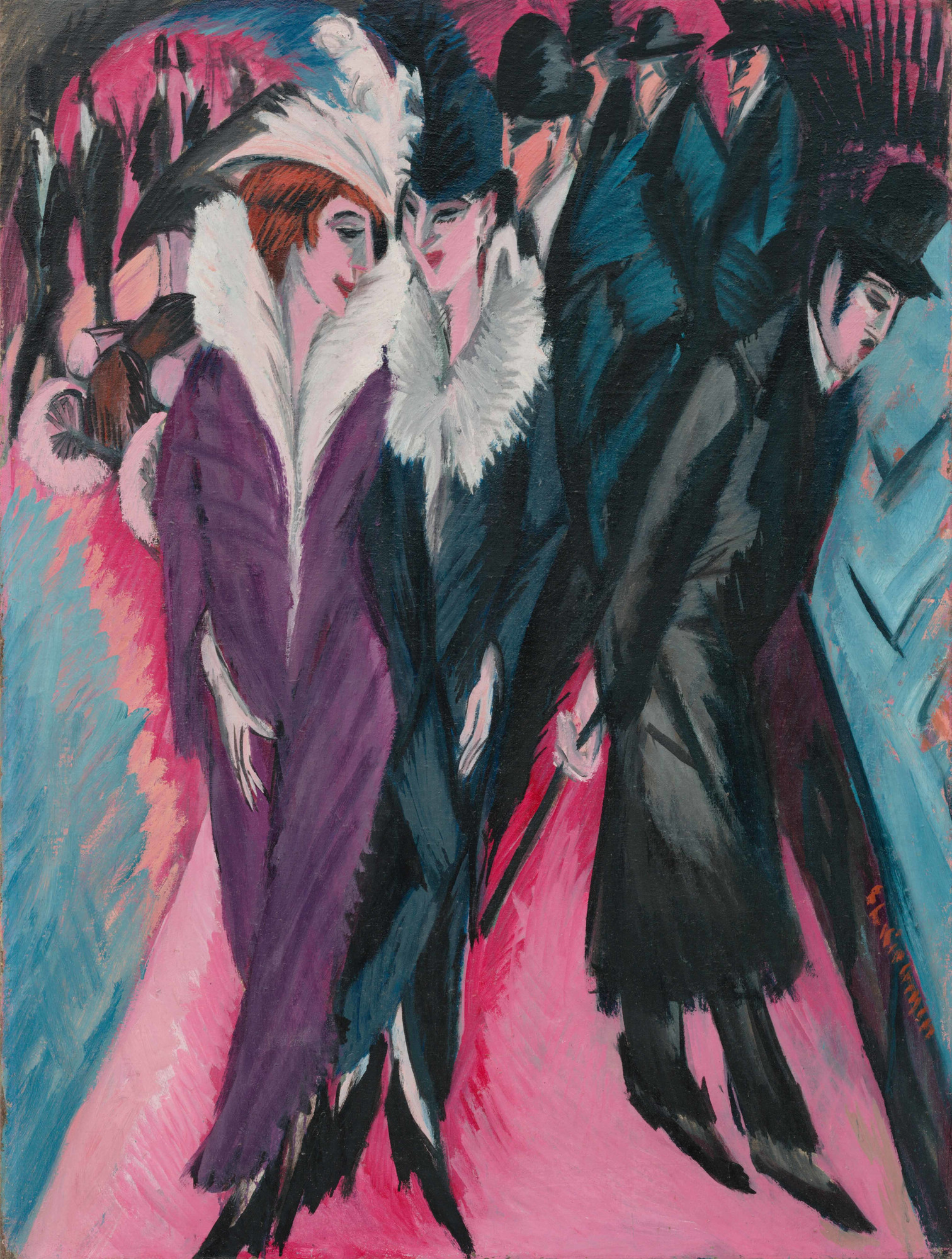
Ernst Kirchner, Die Brücke, 1913

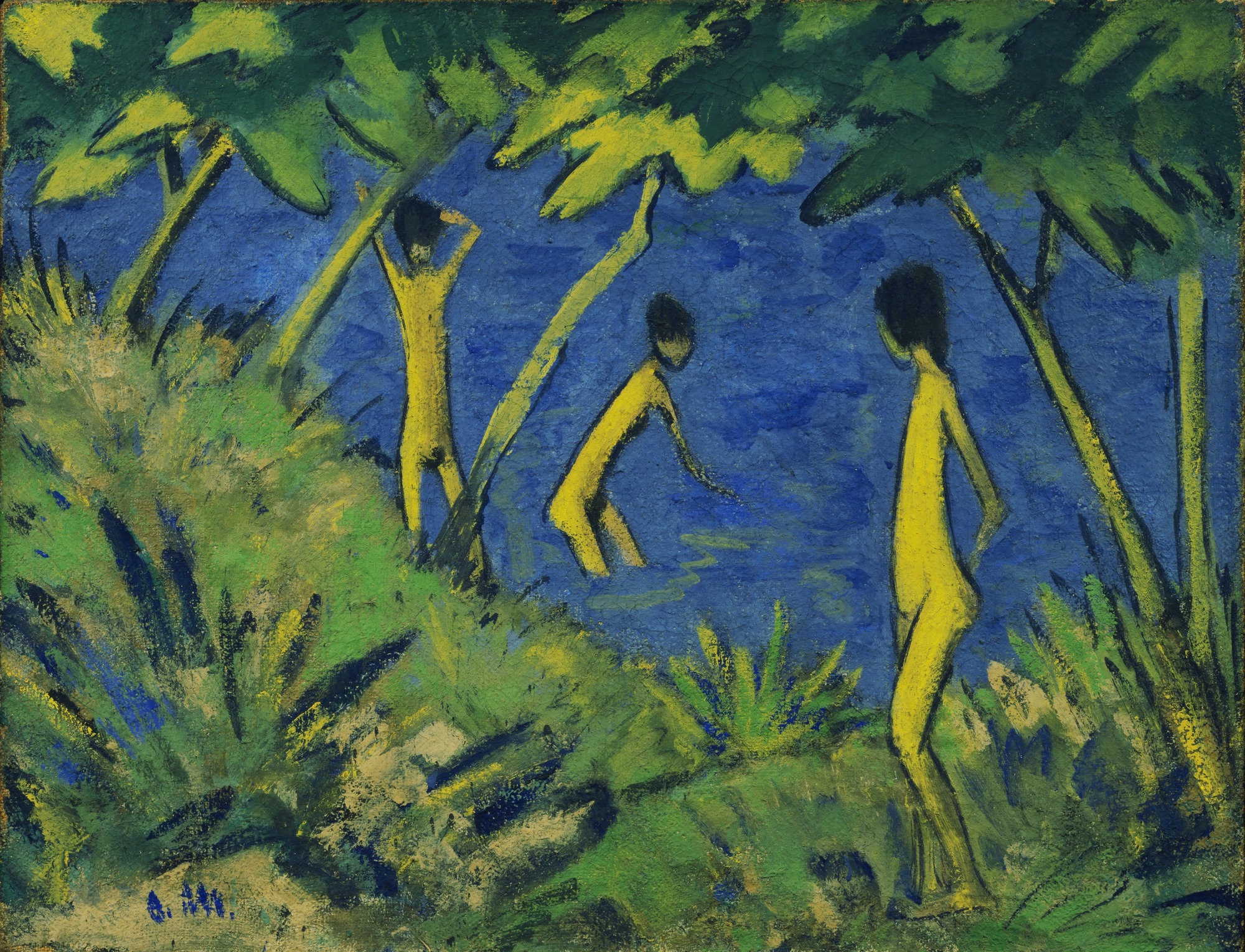
Otto Mueller, Die Brücke, 1919

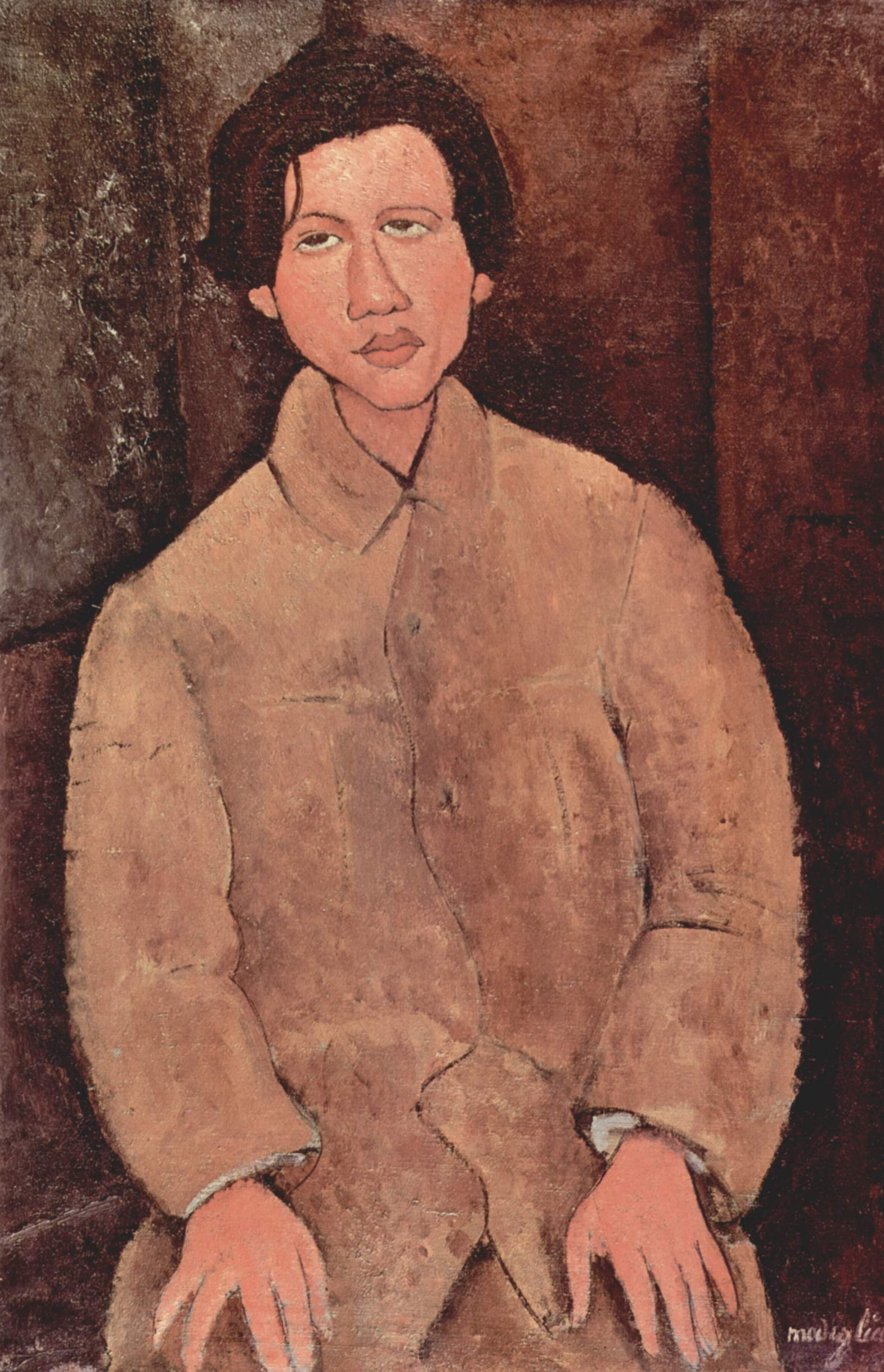
Amedeo Modigliani, Portrait of Soutine 1916, Soutine was an important practitioner of Expressionism

Les Fauves (French for The Wild Beasts) were early-20th-century painters, experimenting with freedom of expression through color. The name was given, humorously and not as a compliment, to the group by art critic Louis Vauxcelles. Fauvism was a short-lived and loose grouping of artists whose works emphasized painterly qualities and the imaginative use of deep color over the representational values. Fauvists made the subject of the painting easy to read and exaggerated perspectives. A prescient prediction of the Fauves was expressed in 1888 by Paul Gauguin to Paul Sérusier:

"How do you see these trees? They are yellow. So, put in yellow; this shadow, rather blue, paint it with pure ultramarine; these red leaves? Put in vermilion."

The leaders of the movement were Henri Matisse and André Derain—friendly rivals of a sort, each with his own followers. Ultimately Matisse became the yang to Picasso's yin in the 20th century. Fauvist painters included Albert Marquet, Charles Camoin, Maurice de Vlaminck, Raoul Dufy, Othon Friesz, the Dutch painter Kees van Dongen, and Picasso's partner in Cubism, Georges Braque amongst others.

Fauvism, as a movement, had no concrete theories, and was short lived, beginning in 1905 and ending in 1907. The Fauves had only three exhibitions. Matisse was seen as the leader of the movement, due to his seniority in age and prior self-establishment in the academic art world. His 1905 portrait of Mme. Matisse, The Green Line (above), caused a sensation in Paris when it was first exhibited. He said he wanted to create art to delight; art as a decoration was his purpose and it can be said that his use of bright colors tries to maintain serenity of composition. In 1906 at the suggestion of his dealer Ambroise Vollard, André Derain went to London and produced a series of paintings like Charing Cross Bridge, London (above) in the Fauvist style, paraphrasing the famous series by the Impressionist painter Claude Monet.

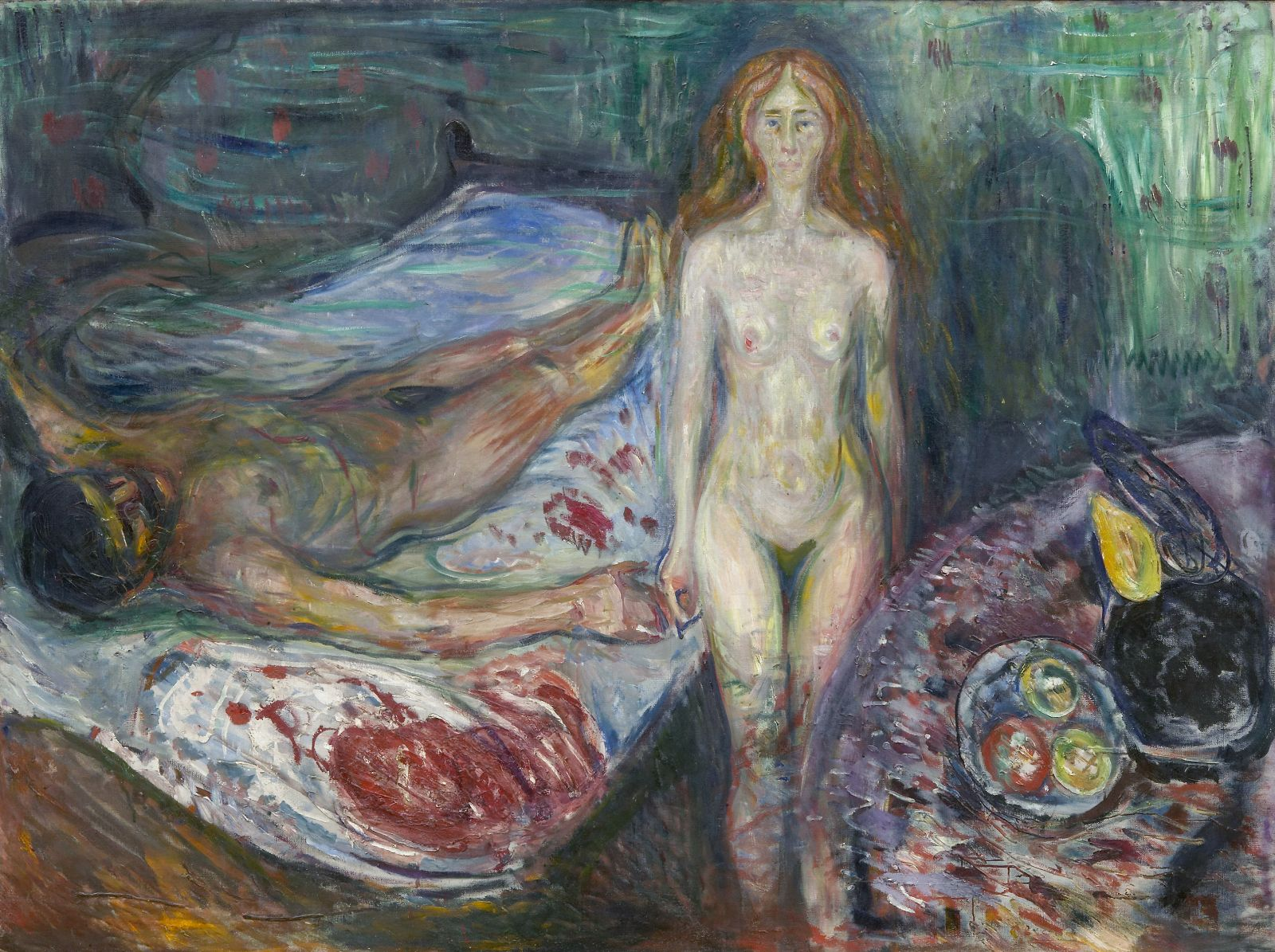
Edvard Munch, Death of Marat I (1907), an example of Expressionism

By 1907 Fauvism no longer was a shocking new movement, soon it was replaced by Cubism on the critics radar screen as the latest new development in Contemporary Art of the time. In 1907 Apollinaire, commenting about Matisse in an article published in La Falange, said, "We are not here in the presence of an extravagant or an extremist undertaking: Matisse's art is eminently reasonable."

Der Blaue Reiter was a German movement lasting from 1911 to 1914, fundamental to Expressionism, along with Die Brücke, a group of German expressionist artists formed in Dresden in 1905. Founding members of Die Brücke were Fritz Bleyl, Erich Heckel, Ernst Ludwig Kirchner and Karl Schmidt-Rottluff. Later members included Max Pechstein, Otto Mueller and others. This was a seminal group, which in due course had a major impact on the evolution of modern art in the 20th century and created the style of Expressionism.

Wassily Kandinsky, Franz Marc, August Macke, Alexej von Jawlensky, whose psychically expressive painting of the Russian dancer Portrait of Alexander Sakharoff, 1909 is in the gallery above, Marianne von Werefkin, Lyonel Feininger and others founded the Der Blaue Reiter group in response to the rejection of Kandinsky's painting Last Judgement from an exhibition. Der Blaue Reiter lacked a central artistic manifesto, but was centered around Kandinsky and Marc. Artists Gabriele Münter and Paul Klee were also involved.

The name of the movement comes from a painting by Kandinsky created in 1903. It is also claimed that the name could have derived from Marc's enthusiasm for horses and Kandinsky's love of the colour blue. For Kandinsky, blue is the colour of spirituality: the darker the blue, the more it awakens human desire for the eternal.

=== Expressionism, Symbolism, American Modernism, Bauhaus ===
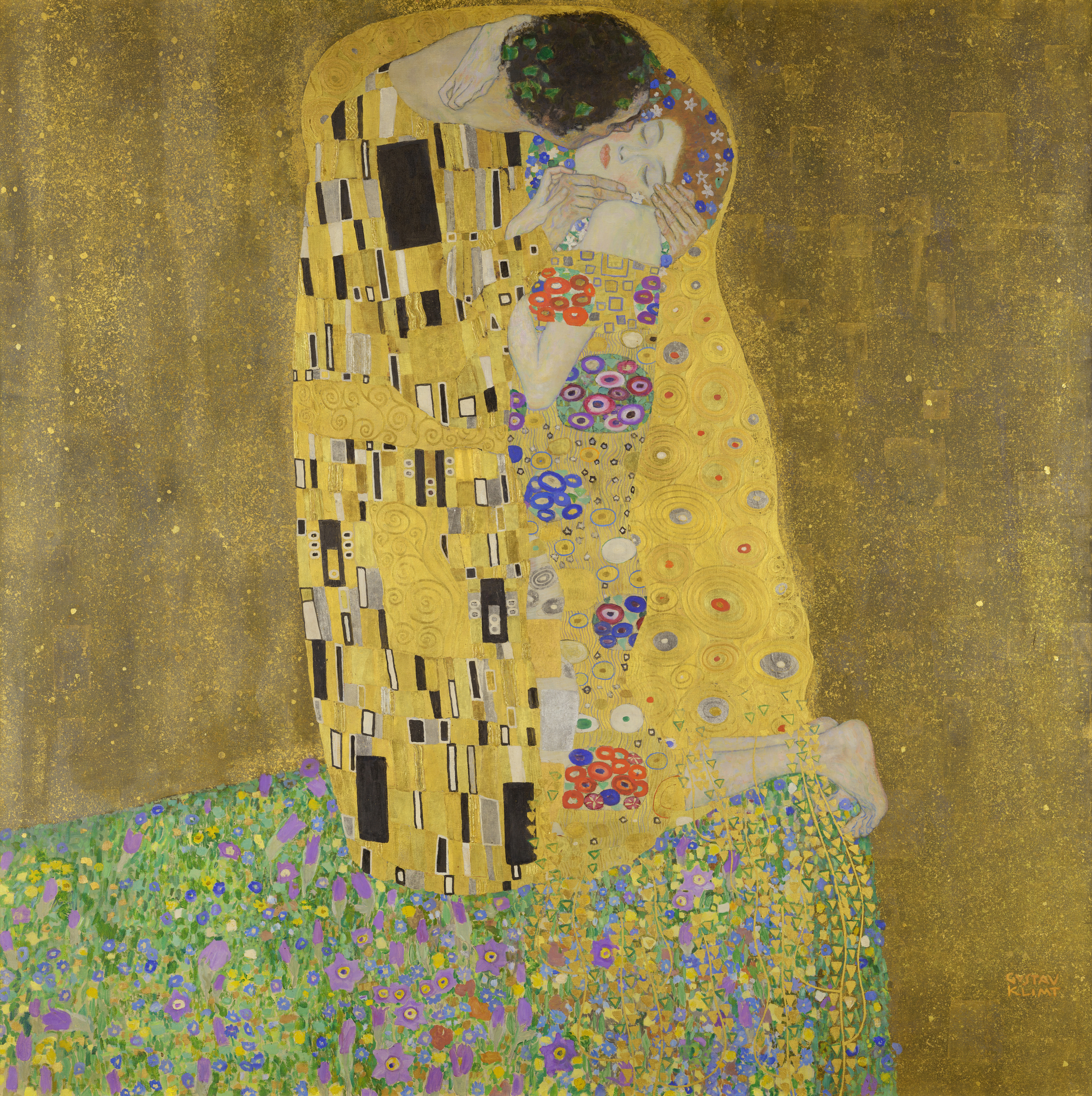
Gustav Klimt, Expressionism, 1907–1908

Marc Chagall, Expressionism and Surrealism, 1911

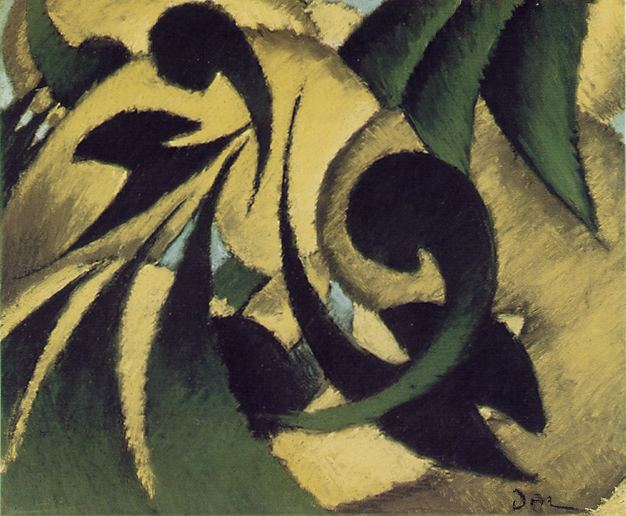
Arthur Dove, early American modernism, 1911

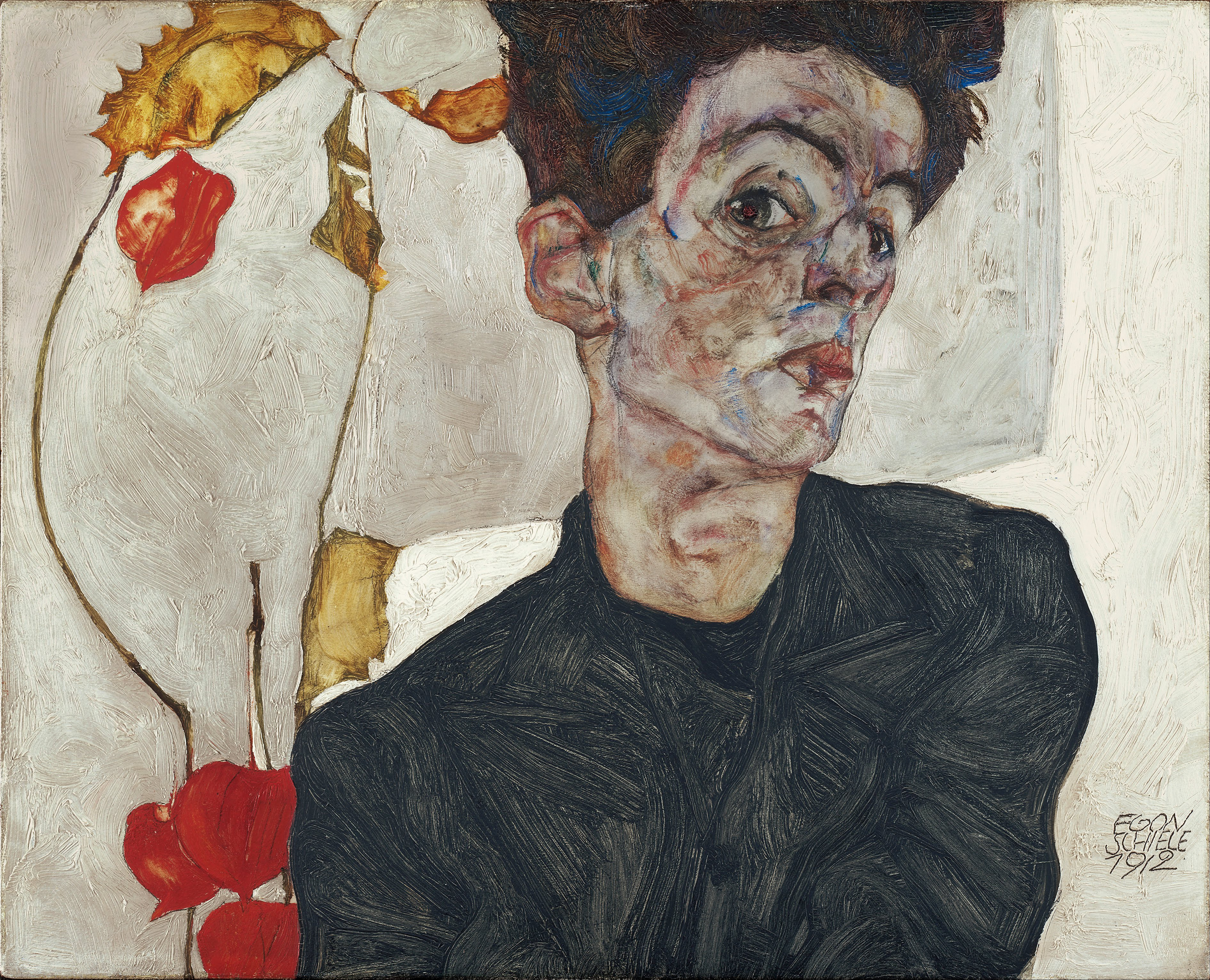
Egon Schiele, Symbolism and Expressionism, 1912

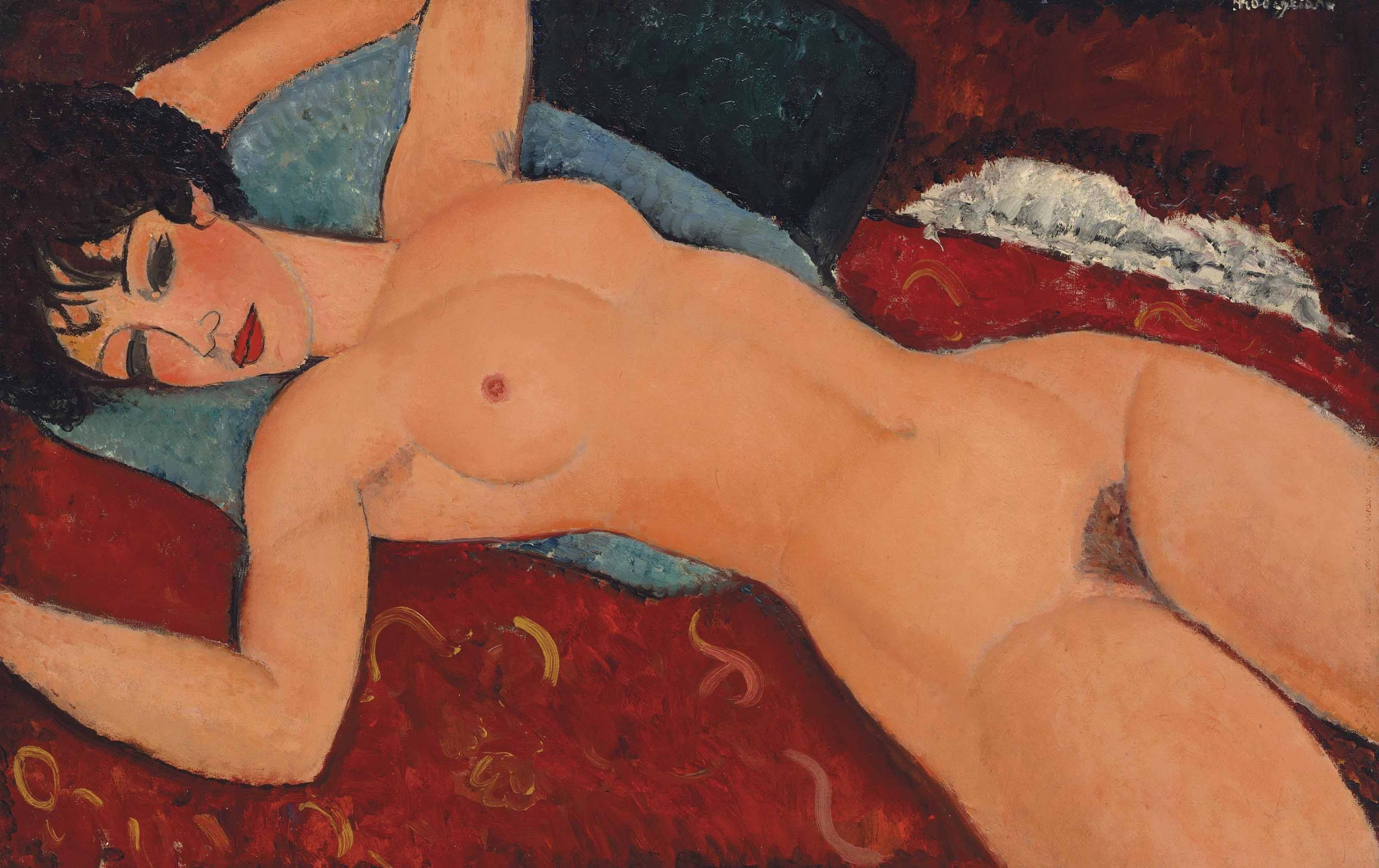
Amedeo Modigliani, Symbolism and Expressionism, 1917

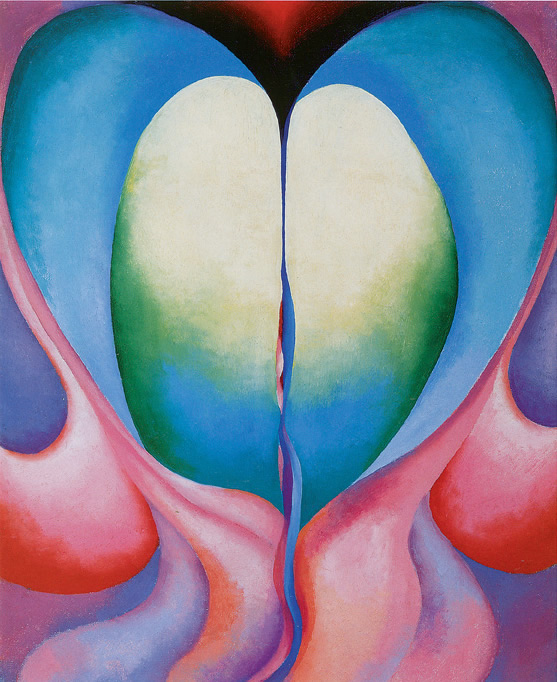
Georgia O'Keeffe, American modernism, 1918

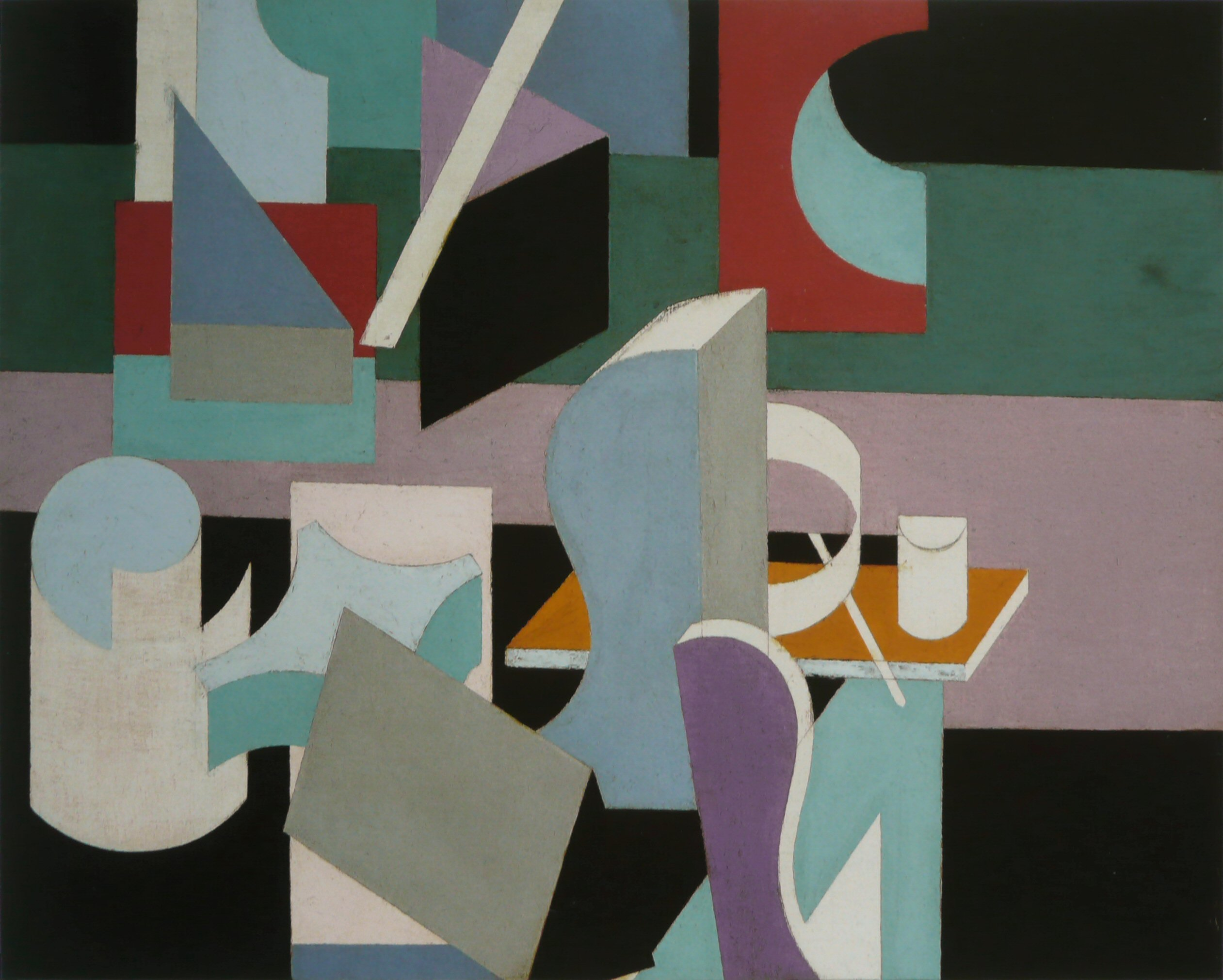
Patrick Henry Bruce, American modernism, 1917–1918

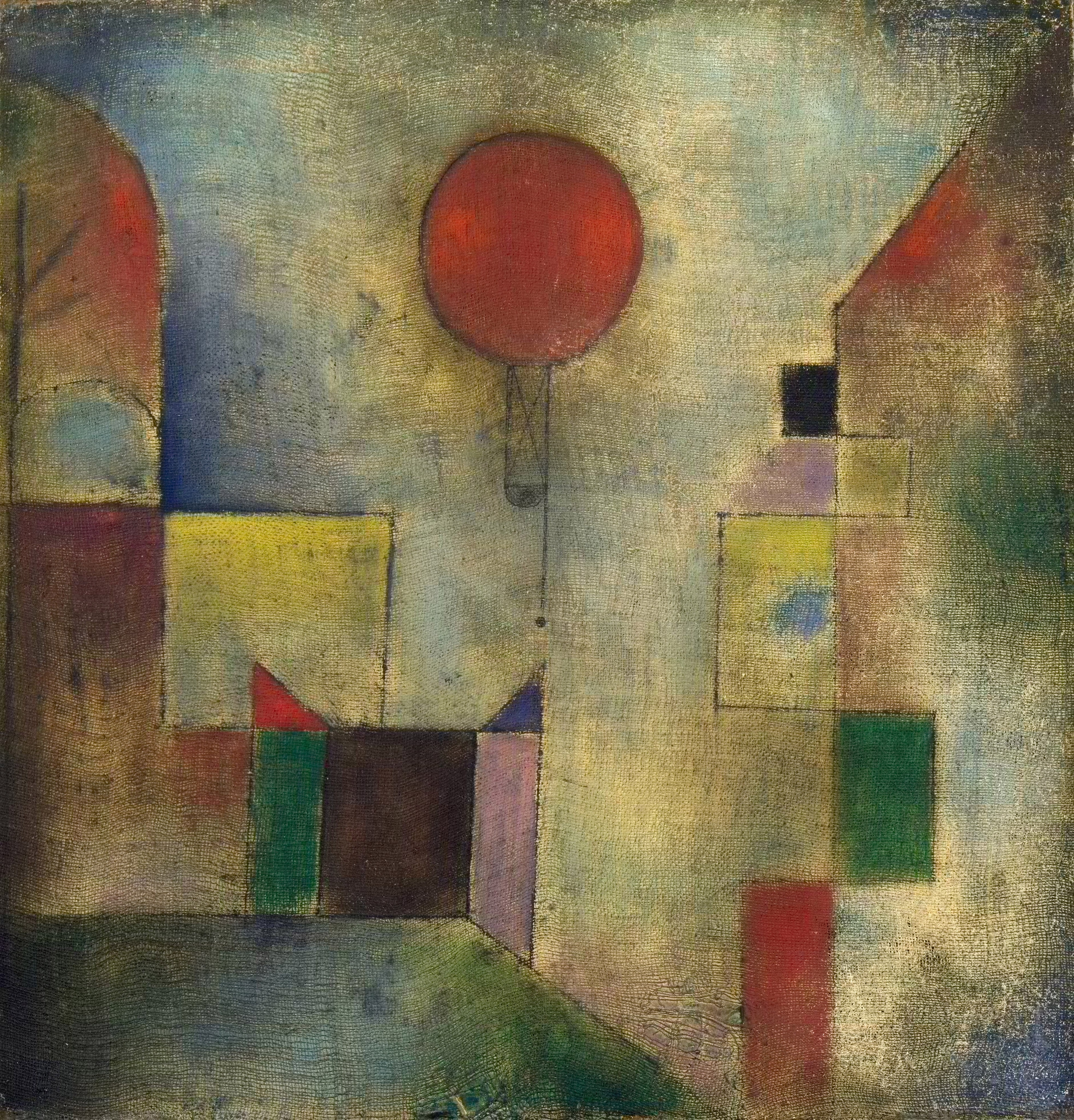
Paul Klee, Bauhaus, 1922

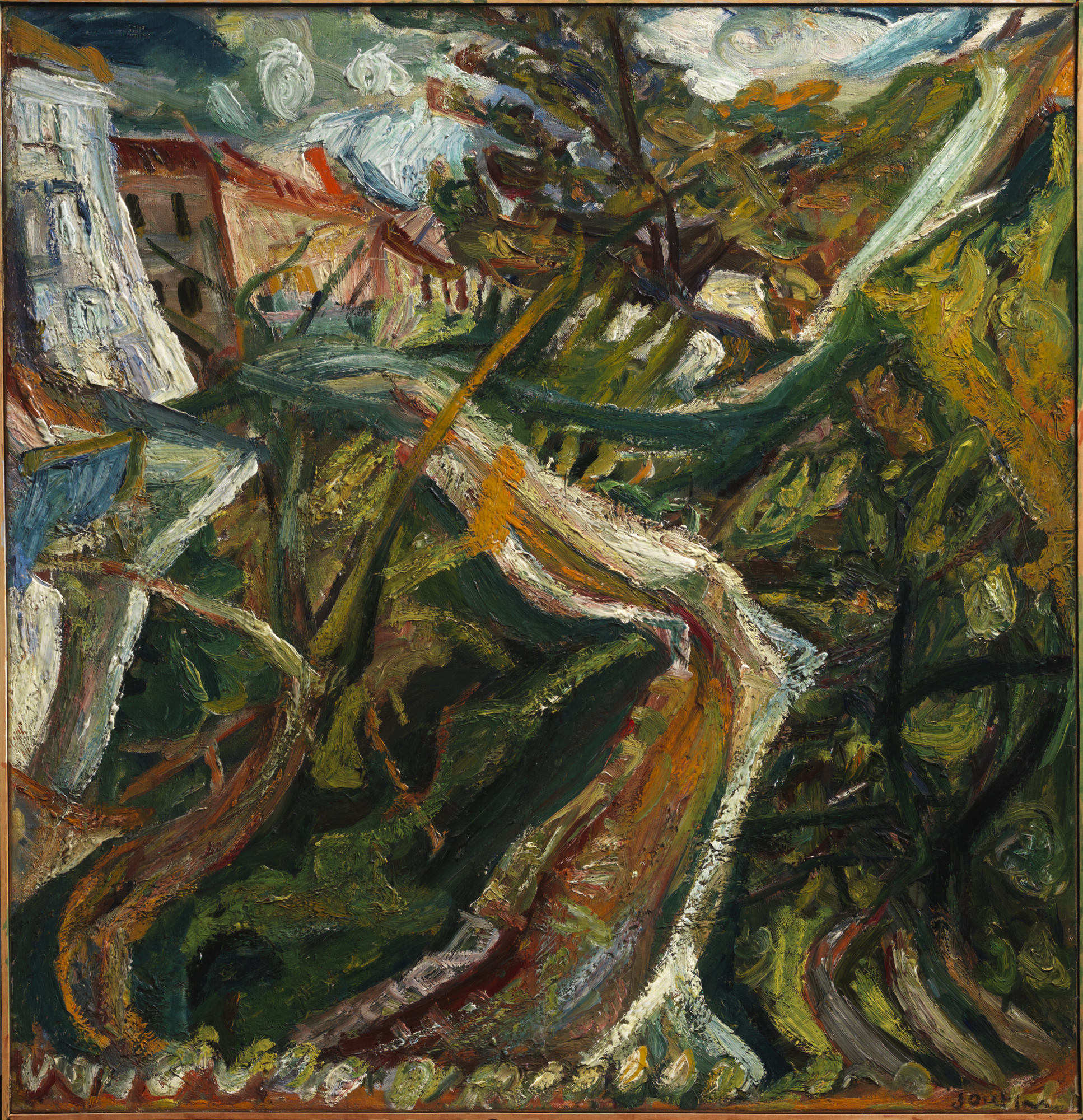
Chaïm Soutine, Expressionism, c. 1920

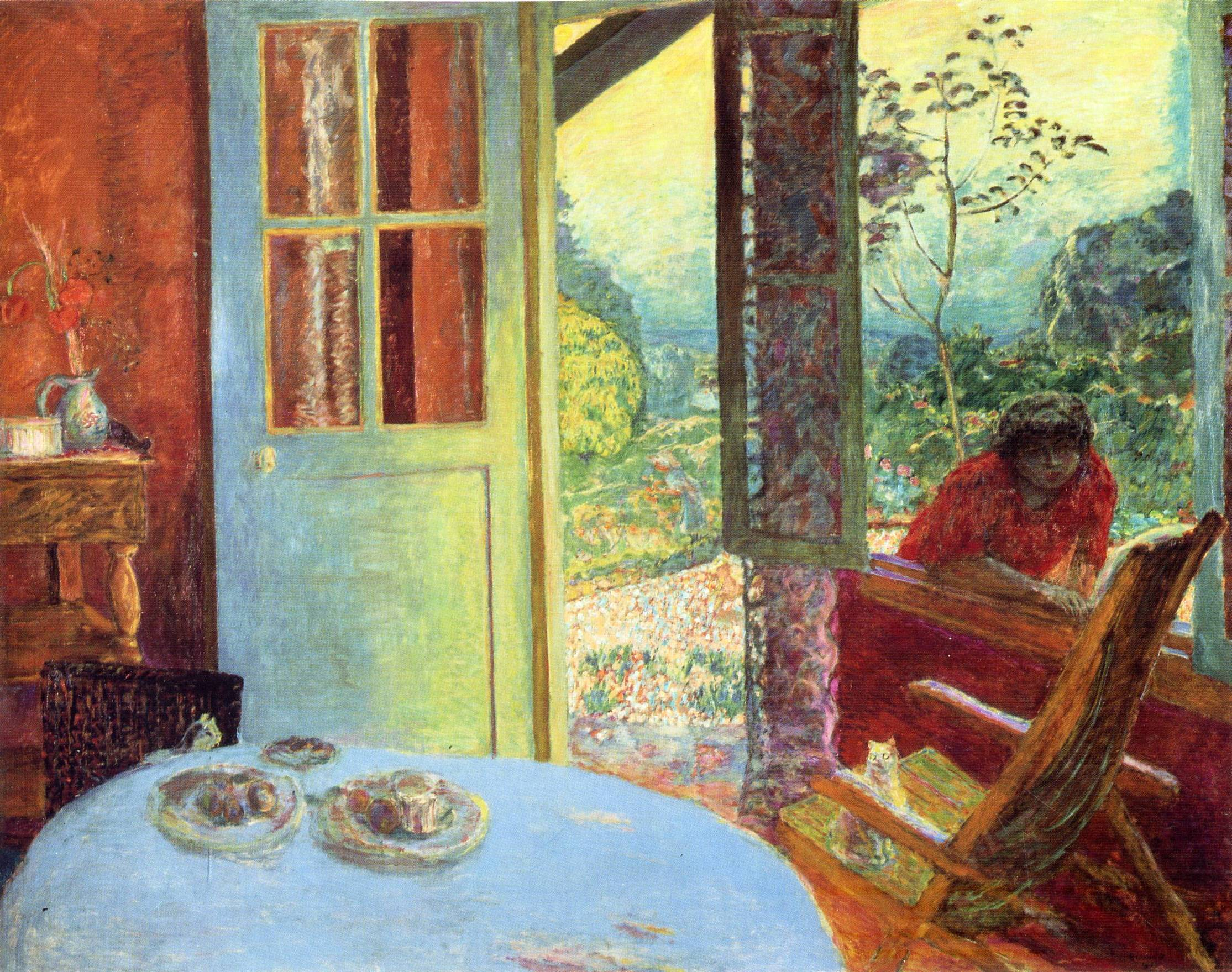
Pierre Bonnard, 1913, European modernist Narrative painting

Expressionism and Symbolism are broad rubrics encompassing several important and related movements in 20th-century painting that dominated much of the avant-garde art being made in Western, Eastern, and Northern Europe. Expressionist works were painted largely between World War I and World War II, mostly in France, Germany, Norway, Russia, Belgium, and Austria. Expressionist styles are related to those of both Surrealism and Symbolism and are each uniquely and somewhat eccentrically personal. Fauvism, Die Brücke, and Der Blaue Reiter are three of the best known groups of Expressionist and Symbolist painters. Artists as interesting and diverse as Marc Chagall, whose painting I and the Village, (above) tells an autobiographical story that examines the relationship between the artist and his origins, with a lexicon of artistic Symbolism. Gustav Klimt, Egon Schiele, Edvard Munch, Emil Nolde, Chaïm Soutine, James Ensor, Oskar Kokoschka, Ernst Ludwig Kirchner, Yitzhak Frenkel Frenel, Max Beckmann, Franz Marc, Käthe Schmidt Kollwitz, Georges Rouault, Amedeo Modigliani and some of the Americans abroad like Marsden Hartley, and Stuart Davis, were considered influential expressionist painters. Although Alberto Giacometti is primarily thought of as an intense Surrealist sculptor, he made intense expressionist paintings as well. In the USA during the period between World War I and World War II painters tended to go to Europe for recognition. Modernist artists like Marsden Hartley, Patrick Henry Bruce, Gerald Murphy and Stuart Davis, created reputations abroad. While Patrick Henry Bruce, created cubist related paintings in Europe, both Stuart Davis and Gerald Murphy made paintings that were early inspirations for American pop art and Marsden Hartley experimented with expressionism. During the 1920s photographer Alfred Stieglitz exhibited Georgia O'Keeffe, Arthur Dove, Alfred Henry Maurer, Charles Demuth, John Marin and other artists including European Masters Henri Matisse, Auguste Rodin, Henri Rousseau, Paul Cézanne, and Pablo Picasso, at his New York City gallery the 291. In Europe masters like Henri Matisse and Pierre Bonnard continued developing their narrative styles independent of any movement.

=== Dada and Surrealism ===
Giorgio de Chirico, The Red Tower (La Tour Rouge), 1913, early Surrealism

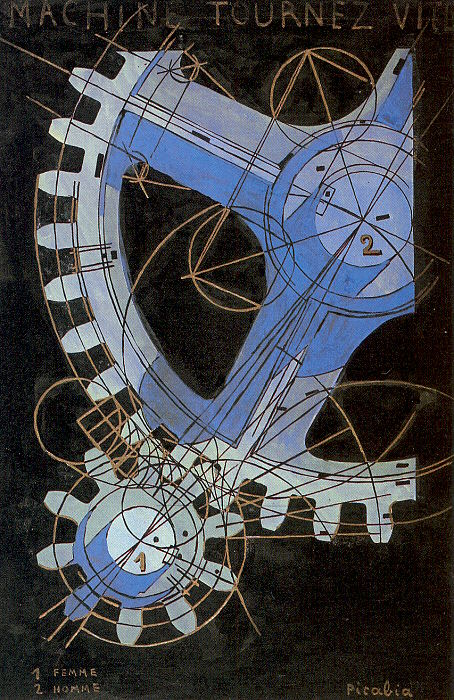
Francis Picabia, Machine Turn Quickly 1916, Dada

André Masson, 1922, Surrealism

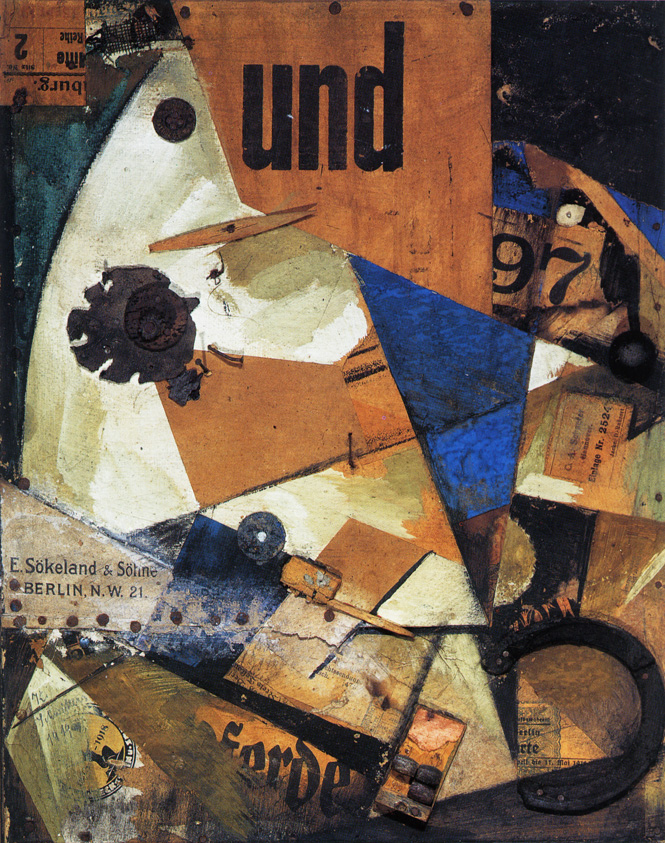
Kurt Schwitters, 1919, painted collage, Dada

Max Ernst, Murdering Airplane, 1920, early Surrealism

Joan Miró, Horse, Pipe and Red Flower, 1920, early Surrealism

Marcel Duchamp came to international prominence in the wake of the New York City Armory Show in 1913 where his Nude Descending a Staircase became the cause célèbre. He subsequently created The Bride Stripped Bare by Her Bachelors, Even, Large Glass. The Large Glass pushed the art of painting to radical new limits being part painting, part collage, part construction. Duchamp (who was soon to renounce artmaking for chess) became closely associated with the Dada movement that began in neutral Zürich, Switzerland, during World War I and peaked from 1916 to 1920. The movement primarily involved visual arts, literature (poetry, art manifestoes, art theory), theatre, and graphic design, and concentrated its anti war politic through a rejection of the prevailing standards in art through anti-art cultural works. Francis Picabia, Man Ray, Kurt Schwitters, Tristan Tzara, Hans Richter, Jean Arp, Sophie Taeuber-Arp, along with Duchamp and many others are associated with the Dadaist movement. Duchamp and several Dadaists are also associated with Surrealism, the movement that dominated European painting in the 1920s and 1930s.

Marcel Duchamp, Nude Descending a Staircase, No. 2, 1912, Philadelphia Museum of Art

In 1924 André Breton published the Surrealist Manifesto. The Surrealist movement in painting became synonymous with the avant-garde and which featured artists whose works varied from the abstract to the super-realist. With works on paper like Machine Turn Quickly (above) Francis Picabia continued his involvement in the Dada movement through 1919 in Zürich and Paris, before breaking away from it after developing an interest in Surrealist art. Yves Tanguy, René Magritte and Salvador Dalí are particularly known for their realistic depictions of dream imagery and fantastic manifestations of the imagination. Joan Miró's The Tilled Field of 1923–1924 verges on abstraction, this early painting of a complex of objects and figures, and arrangements of sexually active characters; was Miró's first Surrealist masterpiece. The more abstract Joan Miró, Jean Arp, André Masson, and Max Ernst were very influential, especially in the United States during the 1940s.

Throughout the 1930s, Surrealism continued to become more visible to the public at large. A Surrealist group developed in Britain and, according to Breton, their 1936 London International Surrealist Exhibition was a high-water mark of the period and became the model for international exhibitions. Surrealist groups in Japan, and especially in Latin America, the Caribbean and in Mexico produced innovative and original works.

Dalí and Magritte created some of the most widely recognized images of the movement. The 1928/1929 painting This Is Not A Pipe by Magritte is the subject of a Michel Foucault 1973 book, This is not a Pipe (English edition, 1991), that discusses the painting and its paradox. Dalí joined the group in 1929, and participated in the rapid establishment of the visual style between 1930 and 1935.

Surrealism as a visual movement had found a method: to expose psychological truth by stripping ordinary objects of their normal significance, in order to create a compelling image that was beyond ordinary formal organization, and perception, sometimes evoking empathy from the viewer, sometimes laughter and sometimes outrage and bewilderment.

1931 marked a year when several Surrealist painters produced works which marked turning points in their stylistic evolution: in one example liquid shapes become the trademark of Dalí, particularly in his The Persistence of Memory, which features the image of watches that sag as if they are melting. Evocations of time and its compelling mystery and absurdity.

The characteristics of this style – a combination of the depictive, the abstract, and the psychological – came to stand for the alienation which many people felt in the modernist period, combined with the sense of reaching more deeply into the psyche, to be "made whole with one's individuality."

Max Ernst studied philosophy and psychology in Bonn and was interested in the alternative realities experienced by the insane. His paintings, such as Murdering Airplane (1920), may have been inspired by the psychoanalyst Sigmund Freud's study of the delusions of a paranoiac, Daniel Paul Schreber. Freud identified Schreber's fantasy of becoming a woman as a castration complex. The central image of two pairs of legs refers to Schreber's hermaphroditic desires. Ernst's inscription on the back of the painting reads: The picture is curious because of its symmetry. The two sexes balance one another.

During the 1920s André Masson's work was enormously influential in helping the young artist Joan Miró find his roots in the new Surrealist painting. Miró acknowledged in letters to his dealer Pierre Matisse the importance of Masson as an example to him in his early years in Paris.

Long after personal, political and professional tensions have fragmented the Surrealist group into thin air and ether, Magritte, Miró, Dalí and the other Surrealists continue to define a visual program in the arts. Other prominent surrealist artists include Giorgio de Chirico, Méret Oppenheim, Toyen, Grégoire Michonze, Roberto Matta, Kay Sage, Leonora Carrington, Dorothea Tanning, and Leonor Fini among others.

=== Neue Sachlichkeit, Social realism, regionalism, American Scene painting, Symbolism ===
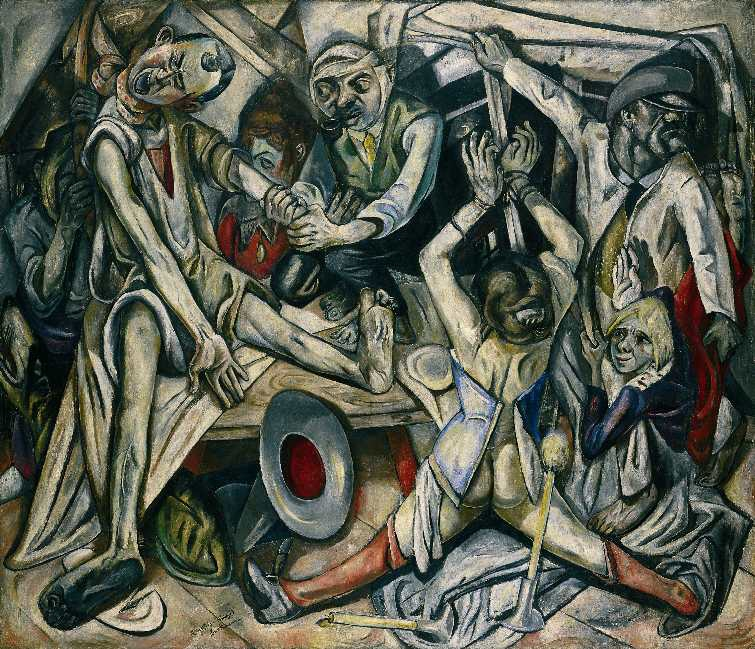
Max Beckmann, The Night (Die Nacht), 1918–1919, Neue Sachlichkeit

George Grosz, 1920, Neue Sachlichkeit

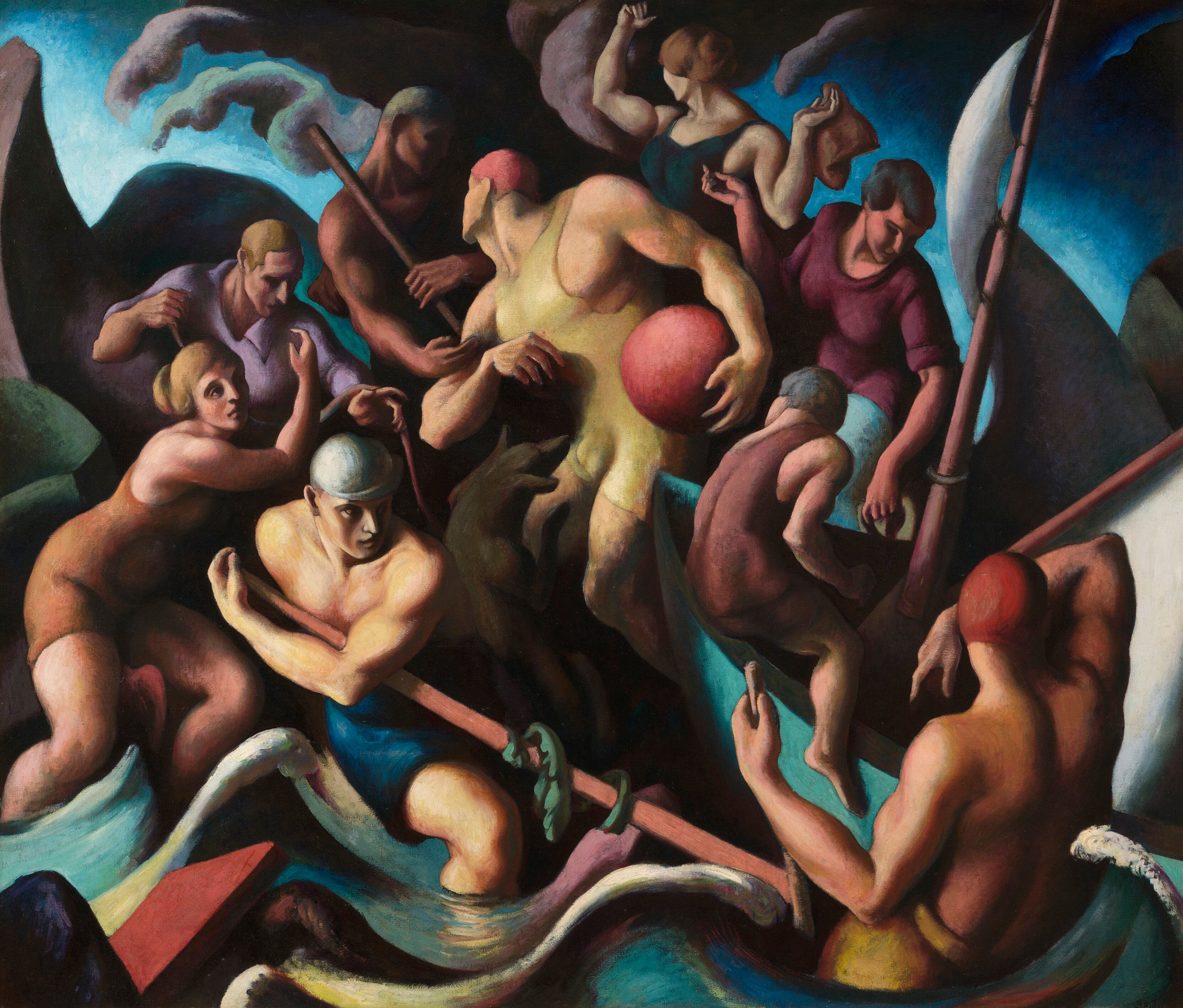
Thomas Hart Benton, 1920, Regionalism

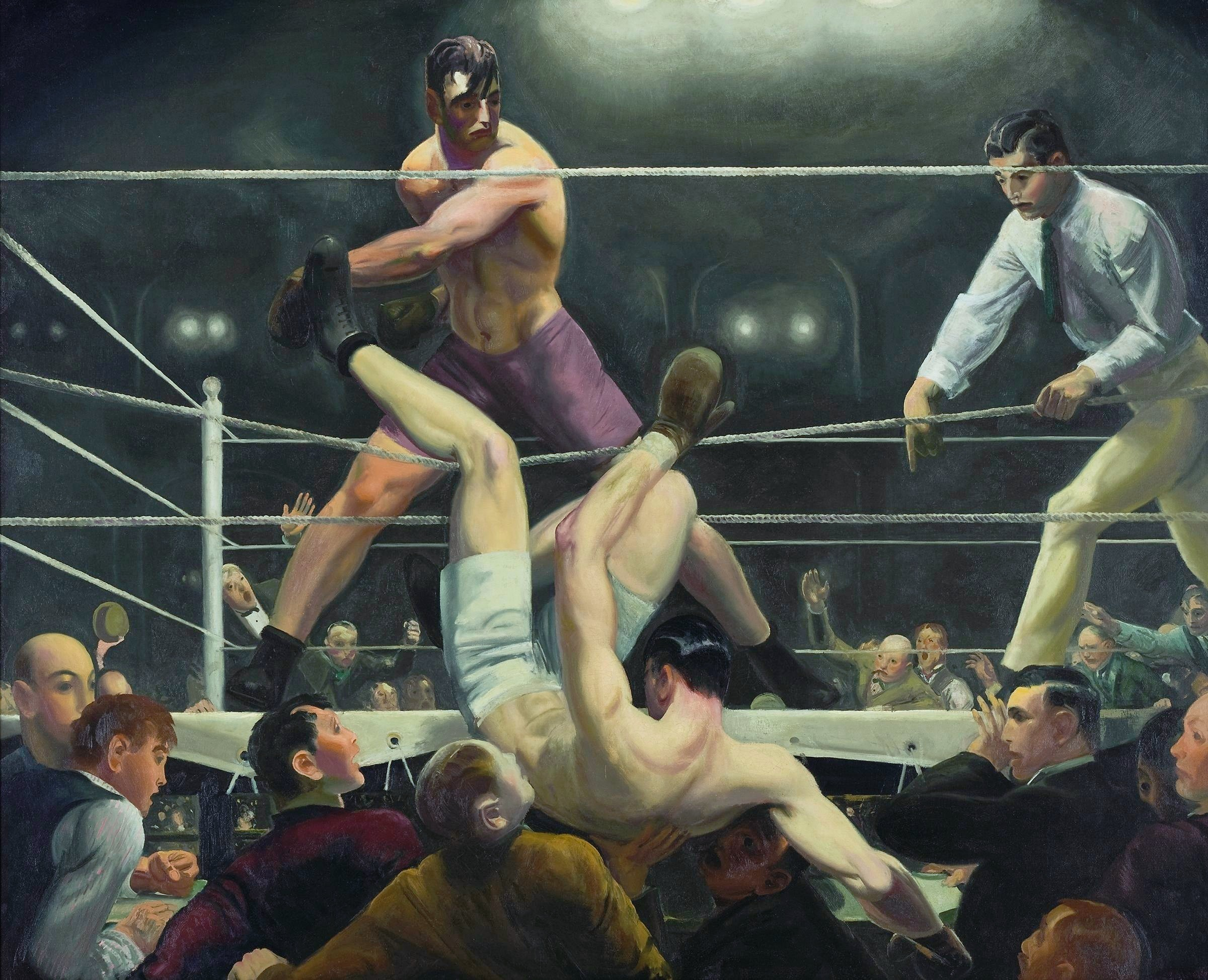
George Bellows, 1924, American realism

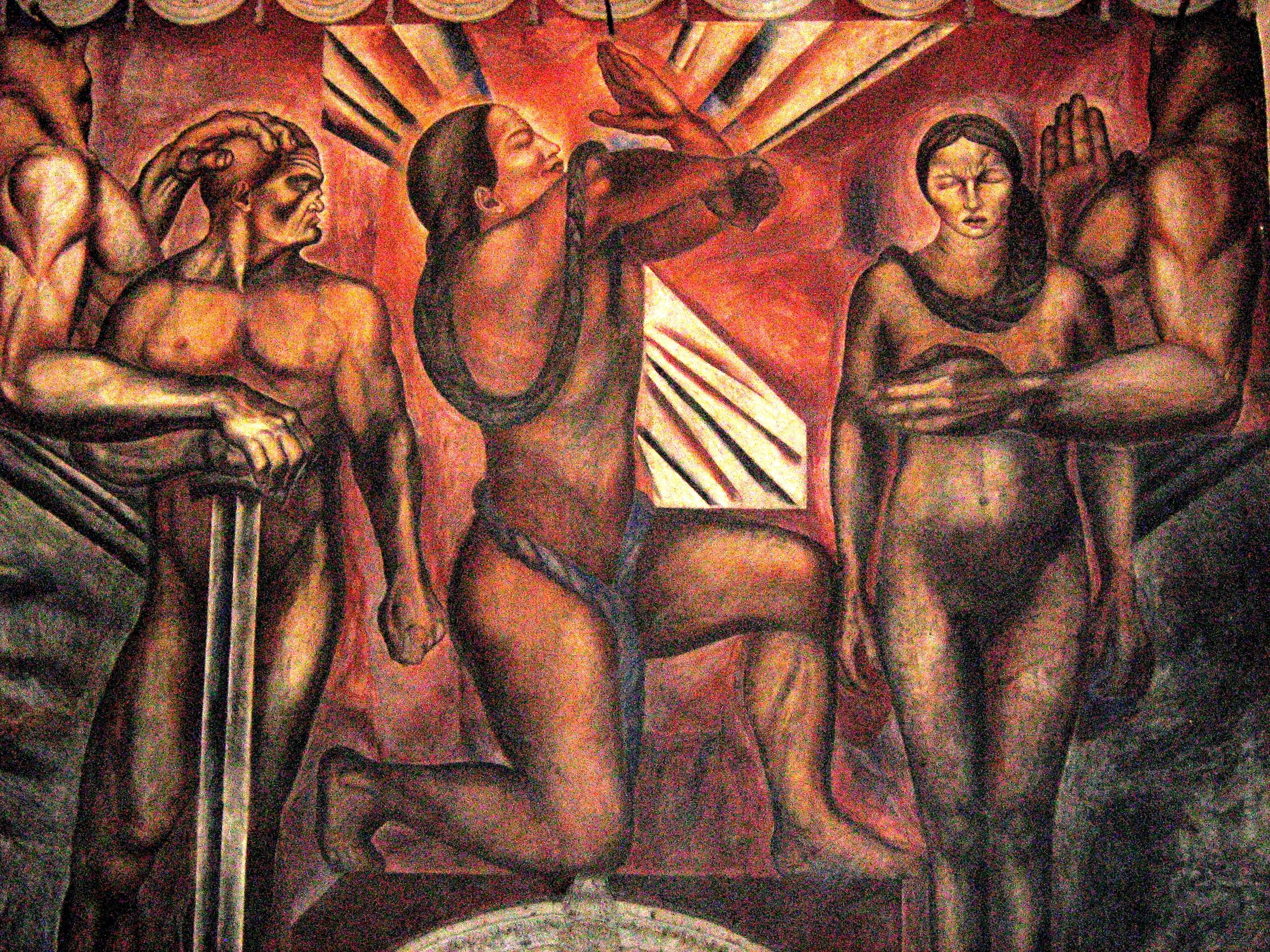
José Orozco, detail of mural Omnisciencia, 1925, Mexican Social Realist Mural Movement

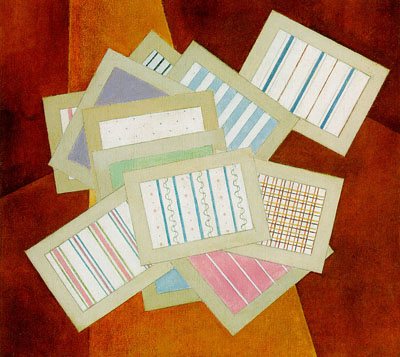
Charles Demuth Spring, 1921, American Precisionism (proto Pop Art)

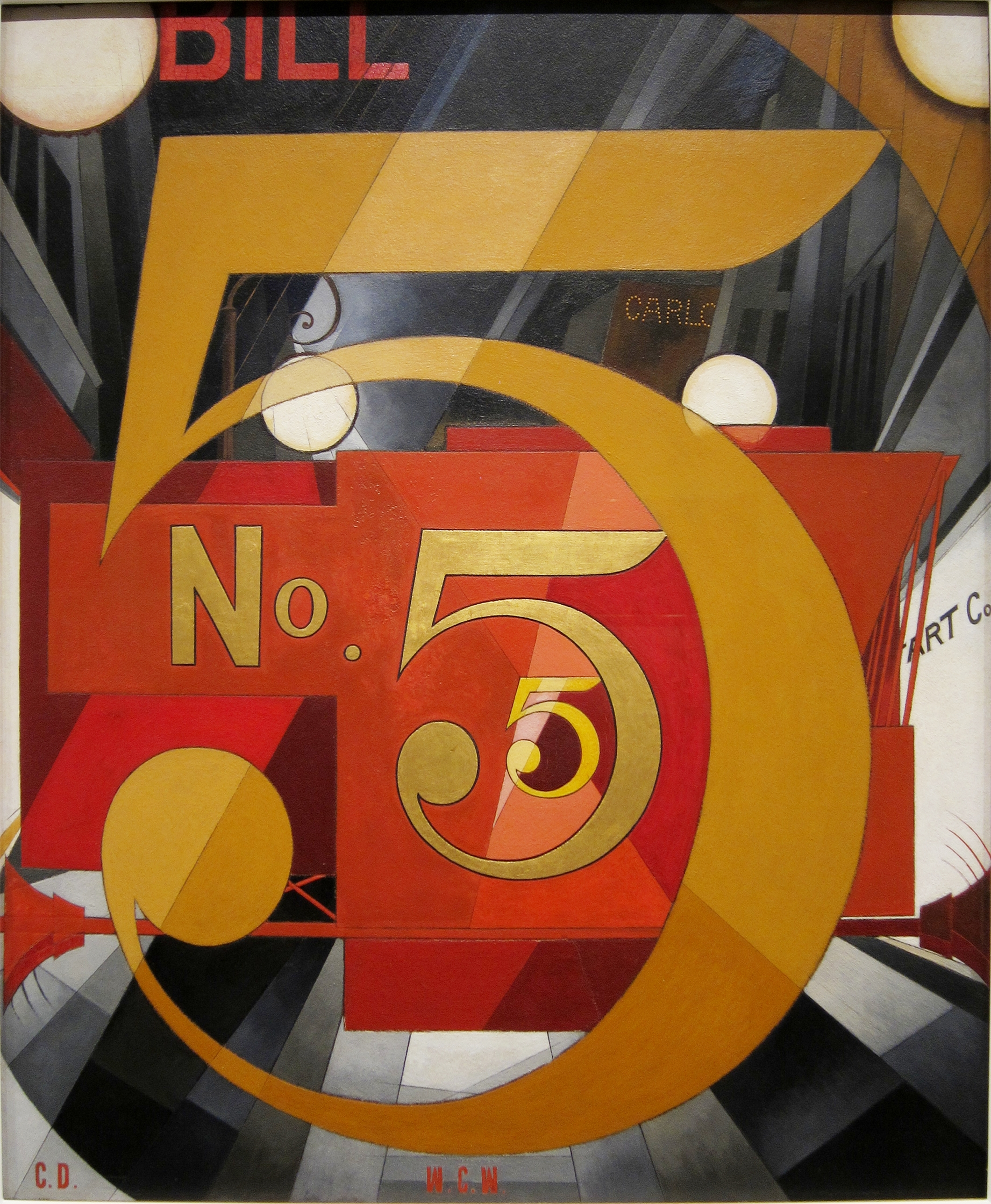
Charles Demuth 1928, American Precisionism (proto Pop Art)

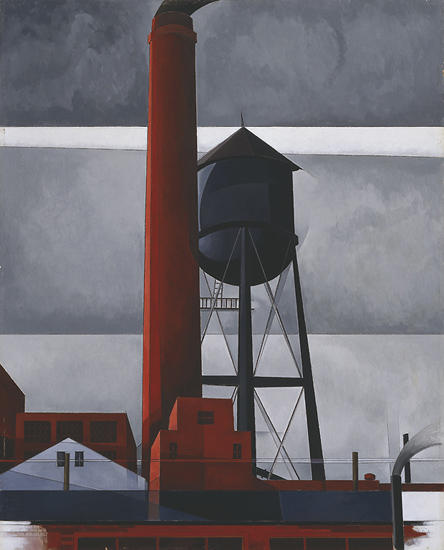
Charles Demuth, 1931, Precisionism

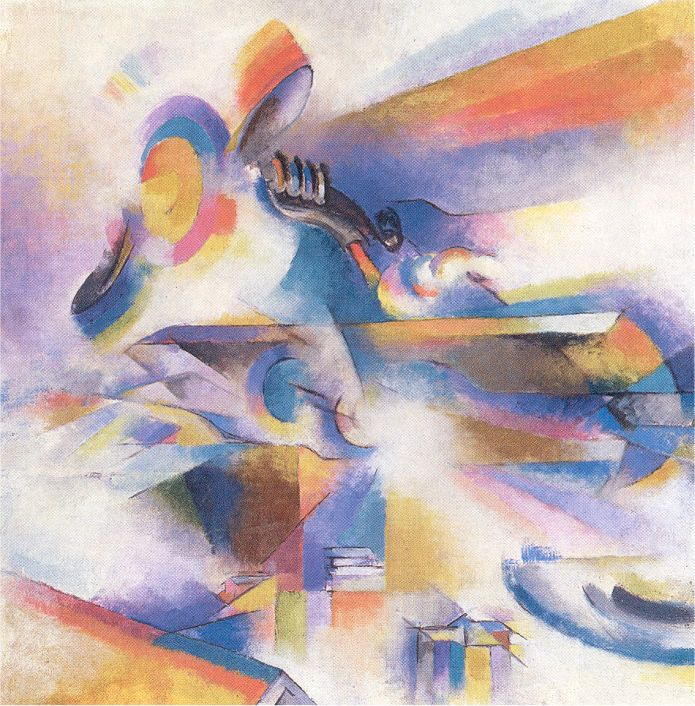
Stanton Macdonald-Wright 1920, Airplane Synchromy in Yellow-Orange, Synchromism

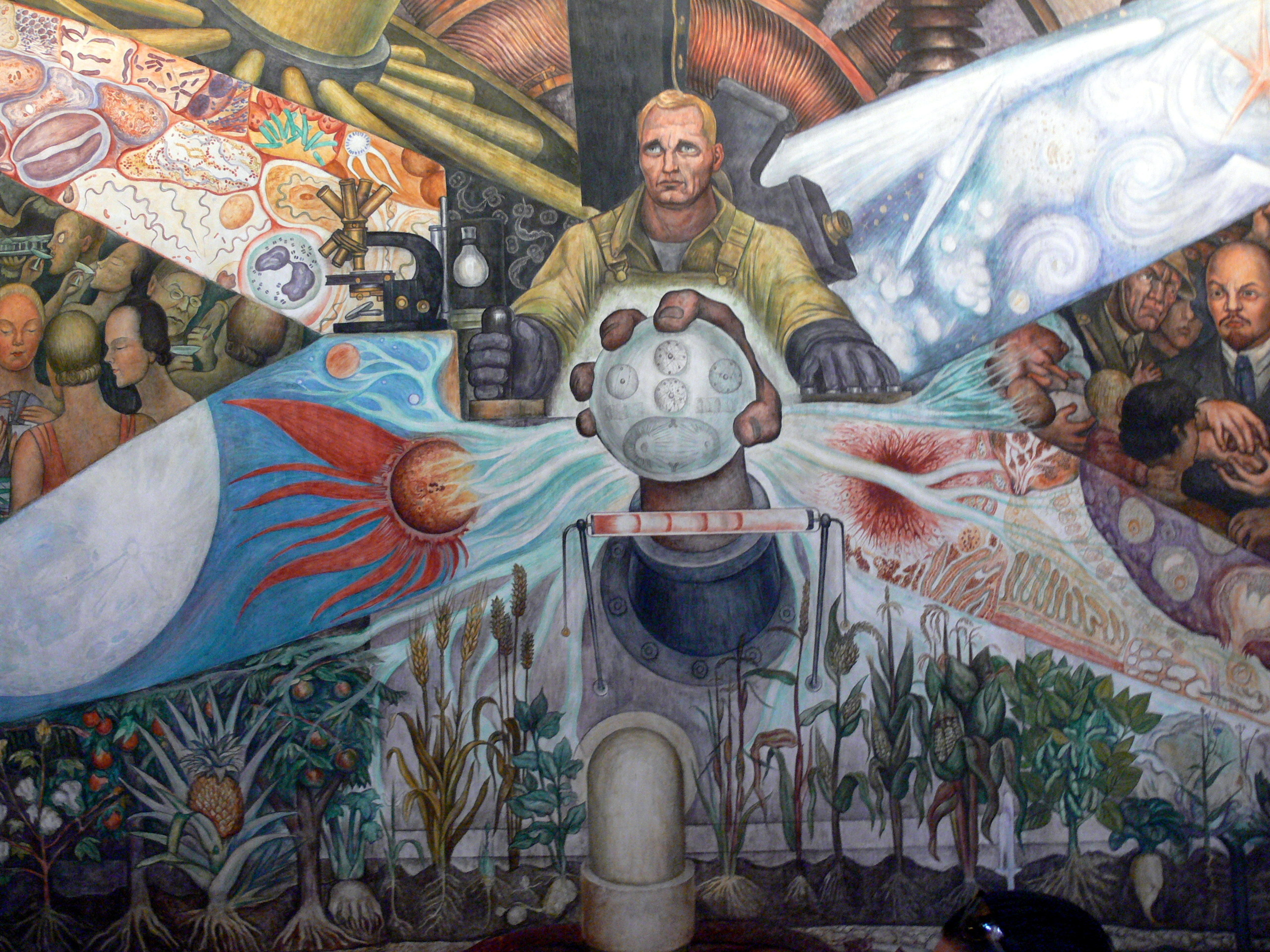
Diego Rivera, Recreation of Man at the Crossroads (renamed Man, Controller of the Universe), originally created in 1934, Mexican muralism movement

During the 1920s and the 1930s and the Great Depression, the European art scene was characterized by Surrealism, late Cubism, the Bauhaus, De Stijl, Dada, Neue Sachlichkeit, and Expressionism; and was occupied by masterful modernist color painters like Henri Matisse and Pierre Bonnard.

American Scene painting and the Social Realism and Regionalism movements that contained both political and social commentary dominated the art world in the USA. Artists like Ben Shahn, Thomas Hart Benton, Grant Wood, George Tooker, John Steuart Curry, Reginald Marsh, and others became prominent. In Latin America besides the Uruguayan painter Joaquín Torres García and Rufino Tamayo from Mexico, the muralist movement with Diego Rivera, David Siqueiros, José Orozco, Pedro Nel Gómez and Santiago Martinez Delgado and the Symbolist paintings by Frida Kahlo began a renaissance of the arts for the region, with a use of color and historic, and political messages. Frida Kahlo's Symbolist works also relate strongly to Surrealism and to the Magic Realism movement in literature. The psychological drama in many of Kahlo's self-portraits (above) underscore the vitality and relevance of her paintings to artists in the 21st century.

In Germany Neue Sachlichkeit ("New Objectivity") emerged as Max Beckmann, Otto Dix, George Grosz and others associated with the Berlin Secession politicized their paintings. The work of these artists grew out of expressionism, and was a response to the political tensions of the Weimar Republic, and was often sharply satirical.

Diego Rivera is perhaps best known by the public for his 1933 mural, Man at the Crossroads, in the lobby of the RCA Building at Rockefeller Center. When his patron Nelson Rockefeller discovered that the mural included a portrait of Lenin and other communist imagery, he fired Rivera, and the unfinished work was eventually destroyed by Rockefeller's staff. The film Cradle Will Rock includes a dramatization of the controversy. Frida Kahlo (Rivera's wife's) works are often characterized by their stark portrayals of pain. Of her 143 paintings 55 are self-portraits, which frequently incorporate symbolic portrayals of her physical and psychological wounds. Kahlo was deeply influenced by indigenous Mexican culture, which is apparent in her paintings' bright colors and dramatic symbolism. Christian and Jewish themes are often depicted in her work as well; she combined elements of the classic religious Mexican tradition—which were often bloody and violent—with surrealist renderings. While her paintings are not overtly Christian—she was an avowed communist—they certainly contain elements of the macabre Mexican Christian style of religious paintings.

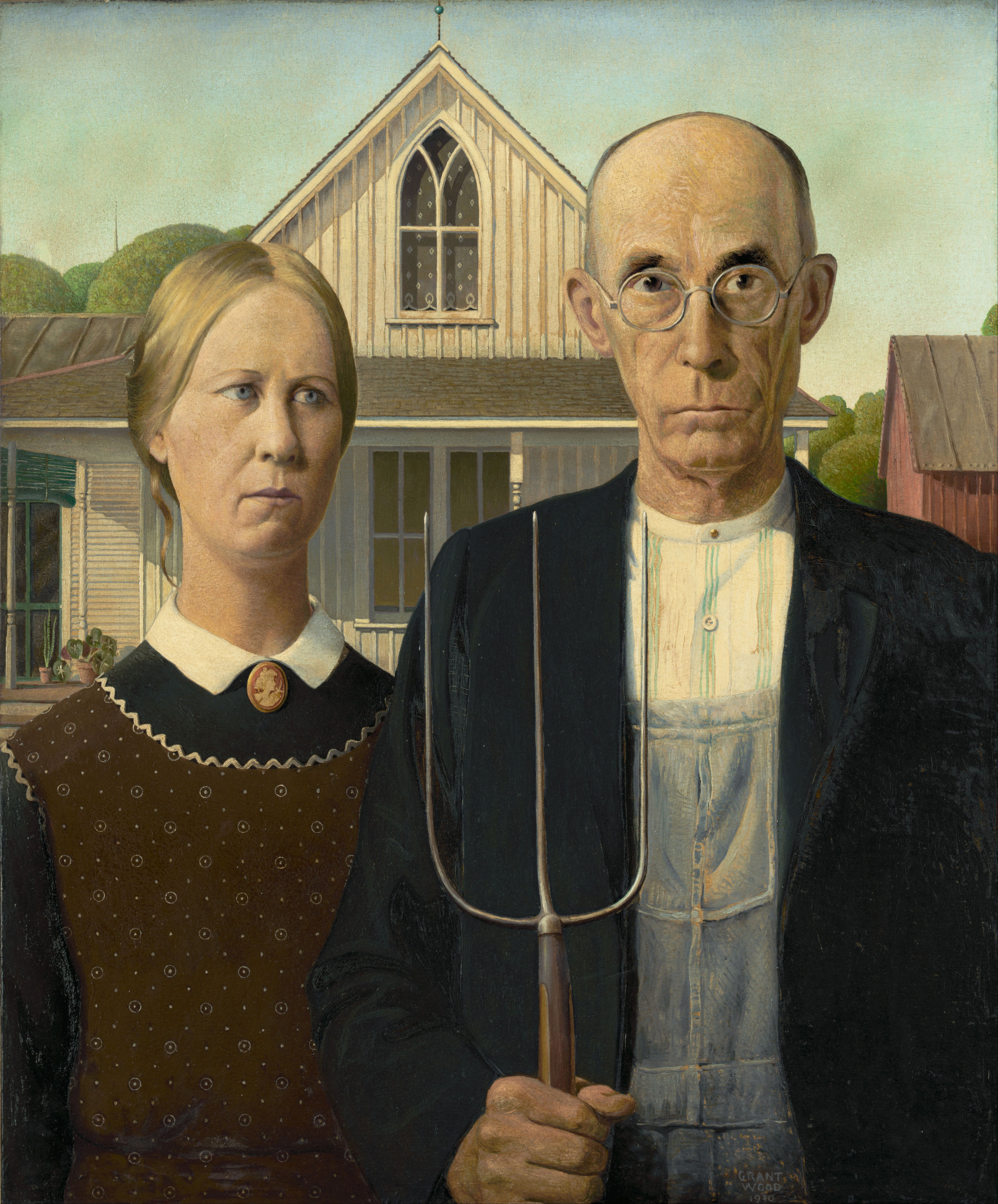
Grant Wood, 1930, Social Realism. American Gothic portrays a pitchfork-holding farmer and a younger woman in front of a house of Carpenter Gothic style. It is one of the most familiar and iconic images in 20th-century American art.

During the 1930s radical leftist politics characterized many of the artists connected to Surrealism, including Pablo Picasso. On 26 April 1937, during the Spanish Civil War, the Basque town of Gernika was the scene of the "Bombing of Gernika" by the Condor Legion of Nazi Germany's Luftwaffe. The Germans were attacking to support the efforts of Francisco Franco to overthrow the Basque Government and the Spanish Republican government. The town was devastated, though the Biscayan assembly and the Oak of Gernika survived. Picasso painted his mural sized Guernica to commemorate the horrors of the bombing.

In its final form, Guernica is an immense black and white, 3.5 metre (11 ft) tall and 7.8 metre (23 ft) wide mural painted in oil. The mural presents a scene of death, violence, brutality, suffering, and helplessness without portraying their immediate causes. The choice to paint in black and white contrasts with the intensity of the scene depicted and invokes the immediacy of a newspaper photograph. Picasso painted the mural sized painting called Guernica in protest of the bombing. The painting was first exhibited in Paris in 1937, then Scandinavia, then London in 1938 and finally in 1939 at Picasso's request the painting was sent to the United States in an extended loan (for safekeeping) at MoMA. The painting went on a tour of museums throughout the U.S. until its final return to the Museum of Modern Art in New York City where it was exhibited for nearly thirty years. Finally in accord with Picasso's wish to give the painting to the people of Spain as a gift, it was sent to Spain in 1981.

During the Great Depression of the 1930s, through the years of World War II American art was characterized by Social Realism and American Scene Painting (as seen above) in the work of Grant Wood, Edward Hopper, Ben Shahn, Thomas Hart Benton, and several others. Nighthawks (1942) is a painting by Edward Hopper that portrays people sitting in a downtown diner late at night. It is not only Hopper's most famous painting, but one of the most recognizable in American art. It is currently in the collection of the Art Institute of Chicago. The scene was inspired by a diner (since demolished) in Greenwich Village, Hopper's home neighborhood in Manhattan. Hopper began painting it immediately after the attack on Pearl Harbor. After this event there was a large feeling of gloominess over the country, a feeling that is portrayed in the painting. The urban street is empty outside the diner, and inside none of the three patrons is apparently looking or talking to the others but instead is lost in their own thoughts. This portrayal of modern urban life as empty or lonely is a common theme throughout Hopper's work.

American Gothic is a painting by Grant Wood from 1930. Portraying a pitchfork-holding farmer and a younger woman in front of a house of Carpenter Gothic style, it is one of the most familiar images in 20th-century American art. Art critics had favorable opinions about the painting, like Gertrude Stein and Christopher Morley, they assumed the painting was meant to be a satire of rural small-town life. It was thus seen as part of the trend towards increasingly critical depictions of rural America, along the lines of Sherwood Anderson's 1919 Winesburg, Ohio, Sinclair Lewis' 1920 Main Street, and Carl Van Vechten's The Tattooed Countess in literature. However, with the onset of the Great Depression, the painting came to be seen as a depiction of steadfast American pioneer spirit.

=== Abstract expressionism ===
The 1940s in New York City heralded the triumph of American abstract expressionism, a modernist movement that combined lessons learned from Henri Matisse, Pablo Picasso, Surrealism, Joan Miró, Cubism, Fauvism, and early Modernism via great teachers in America like Hans Hofmann and John D. Graham. American artists benefited from the presence of Piet Mondrian, Fernand Léger, Max Ernst and the André Breton group, Pierre Matisse's gallery, and Peggy Guggenheim's The Art of This Century Gallery, as well as other factors.

Post-Second World War American painting, called Abstract Expressionism, included artists like Jackson Pollock, Willem de Kooning, Arshile Gorky, Mark Rothko, Hans Hofmann, Clyfford Still, Franz Kline, Adolph Gottlieb, Barnett Newman, Mark Tobey, James Brooks, Philip Guston, Robert Motherwell, Conrad Marca-Relli, Jack Tworkov, William Baziotes, Richard Pousette-Dart, Ad Reinhardt, Esteban Vicente, Hedda Sterne, Jimmy Ernst, Bradley Walker Tomlin, and Theodoros Stamos, among others. American Abstract Expressionism got its name in 1946 from the art critic Robert Coates. It is seen as combining the emotional intensity and self-denial of the German Expressionists with the anti-figurative aesthetic of the European abstract schools such as Futurism, the Bauhaus and Synthetic Cubism. Abstract Expressionism, Action painting, and Color Field painting are synonymous with the New York School.

Technically Surrealism was an important predecessor for Abstract expressionism with its emphasis on spontaneous, automatic or subconscious creation. Jackson Pollock's dripping paint onto a canvas laid on the floor is a technique that has its roots in the work of André Masson. Another important early manifestation of what came to be abstract expressionism is the work of American Northwest artist Mark Tobey, especially his "white writing" canvases, which, though generally not large in scale, anticipate the "all over" look of Pollock's drip paintings.

Additionally, abstract expressionism has an image of being rebellious, anarchic, highly idiosyncratic and, some feel, rather nihilistic. In practice, the term is applied to any number of artists working (mostly) in New York who had quite different styles, and even applied to work which is not especially abstract nor expressionist. Pollock's energetic "action paintings", with their "busy" feel, are different both technically and aesthetically, to the violent and grotesque Women series of Willem de Kooning. As seen above in the gallery Woman V is one of a series of six paintings made by de Kooning between 1950 and 1953 that depict a three-quarter-length female figure. He began the first of these paintings, Woman I collection: The Museum of Modern Art, New York City, in June 1950, repeatedly changing and painting out the image until January or February 1952, when the painting was abandoned unfinished. The art historian Meyer Schapiro saw the painting in de Kooning's studio soon afterwards and encouraged the artist to persist. De Kooning's response was to begin three other paintings on the same theme; Woman II, The Museum of Modern Art, New York City, Woman III, Tehran Museum of Contemporary Art, Woman IV, Nelson-Atkins Museum of Art, Kansas City, Missouri. During the summer of 1952, spent at East Hampton, de Kooning further explored the theme through drawings and pastels. He may have finished work on Woman I by the end of June, or possibly as late as November 1952, and probably the other three women pictures were concluded at much the same time. The Woman series are decidedly figurative paintings. Another important artist is Franz Kline, as demonstrated by his painting High Street, 1950 as with Jackson Pollock and other Abstract Expressionists, was labelled an action painter because of his seemingly spontaneous and intense style, focusing less, or not at all, on figures or imagery, but on the actual brush strokes and use of canvas.

Clyfford Still, Barnett Newman, Adolph Gottlieb, and the serenely shimmering blocks of color in Mark Rothko's work (which is not what would usually be called expressionist and which Rothko denied was abstract), are classified as abstract expressionists, albeit from what Clement Greenberg termed the Color field direction of abstract expressionism. Both Hans Hofmann and Robert Motherwell (gallery) can be comfortably described as practitioners of action painting and Color field painting.

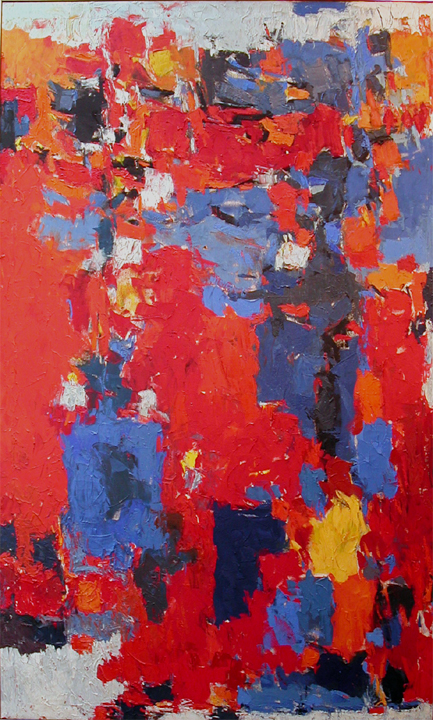
Edward Dugmore, Untitled, 1954, 84 x 51 inches, San Francisco Bay area school of abstract expressionism

Abstract expressionism has many stylistic similarities to the Russian artists of the early twentieth century such as Wassily Kandinsky. Although it is true that spontaneity or of the impression of spontaneity characterized many of the abstract expressionists works, most of these paintings involved careful planning, especially since their large size demanded it. An exception might be the drip paintings of Pollock. Why this style gained mainstream acceptance in the 1950s is a matter of debate. American Social realism had been the mainstream in the 1930s. It had been influenced not only by the Great Depression but also by the Social Realists of Mexico such as David Alfaro Siqueiros and Diego Rivera. The political climate after World War II did not long tolerate the social protests of those painters. Abstract expressionism arose during World War II and began to be showcased during the early 1940s at galleries in New York like The Art of This Century Gallery. The late 1940s through the mid-1950s ushered in the McCarthy era. It was after World War II and a time of political conservatism and extreme artistic censorship in the United States. Some people have conjectured that since the subject matter was often totally abstract, Abstract expressionism became a safe strategy for artists to pursue this style. Abstract art could be seen as apolitical. Or if the art was political, the message was largely for the insiders. However those theorists are in the minority. As the first truly original school of painting in America, Abstract expressionism demonstrated the vitality and creativity of the country in the post-war years, as well as its ability (or need) to develop an aesthetic sense that was not constrained by the European standards of beauty.

Although Abstract expressionism spread quickly throughout the United States, the major centers of this style were New York City and California, especially in the New York School, and the San Francisco Bay area. Abstract expressionist paintings share certain characteristics, including the use of large canvases, an "all-over" approach, in which the whole canvas is treated with equal importance (as opposed to the center being of more interest than the edges). The canvas as the arena became a credo of Action painting, while the integrity of the picture plane became a credo of the Color Field painters. Many other artists began exhibiting their abstract expressionist related paintings during the 1950s including Alfred Leslie, Sam Francis, Joan Mitchell, Helen Frankenthaler, Cy Twombly, Milton Resnick, Michael Goldberg, Norman Bluhm, Ray Parker, Nicolas Carone, Grace Hartigan, Friedel Dzubas, and Robert Goodnough among others.

During the 1950s, Color Field painting initially referred to a particular type of abstract expressionism, especially the work of Mark Rothko, Clyfford Still, Barnett Newman, Robert Motherwell and Adolph Gottlieb. It essentially involved abstract paintings with large, flat expanses of color that expressed the sensual, and visual feelings and properties of large areas of nuanced surface. Art critic Clement Greenberg perceived Color Field painting as related to but different from Action painting. The overall expanse and gestalt of the work of the early color field painters speaks of an almost religious experience, awestruck in the face of an expanding universe of sensuality, color and surface. During the early to mid-1960s, Color Field painting came to refer to the styles of artists like Jules Olitski, Kenneth Noland, and Helen Frankenthaler, whose works were related to second-generation abstract expressionism, and to younger artists like Larry Zox, and Frank Stella – all moving in a new direction. Artists like Clyfford Still, Mark Rothko, Hans Hofmann, Morris Louis, Jules Olitski, Kenneth Noland, Helen Frankenthaler, Larry Zox, and others often used greatly reduced references to nature, and they painted with a highly articulated and psychological use of color. In general these artists eliminated recognizable imagery. In Mountains and Sea, from 1952, a seminal work of Colorfield painting by Helen Frankenthaler the artist used the stain technique for the first time.

In Europe there was the continuation of Surrealism, Cubism, Dada and the works of Matisse. Also in Europe, Tachisme (the European equivalent to Abstract expressionism) and Informalism took hold of the newest generation. Serge Poliakoff, Nicolas de Staël, Georges Mathieu, Vieira da Silva, Jean Dubuffet, Yves Klein and Pierre Soulages among others are considered important figures in post-war European painting.

Eventually abstract painting in America evolved into movements such as Neo-Dada, Color Field painting, Post painterly abstraction, Op art, hard-edge painting, Minimal art, shaped canvas painting, Lyrical Abstraction, Neo-expressionism and the continuation of Abstract expressionism. As a response to the tendency toward abstraction imagery emerged through various new movements, notably Pop art.

=== Realism, Landscape, Figuration, Still-Life, Cityscape ===
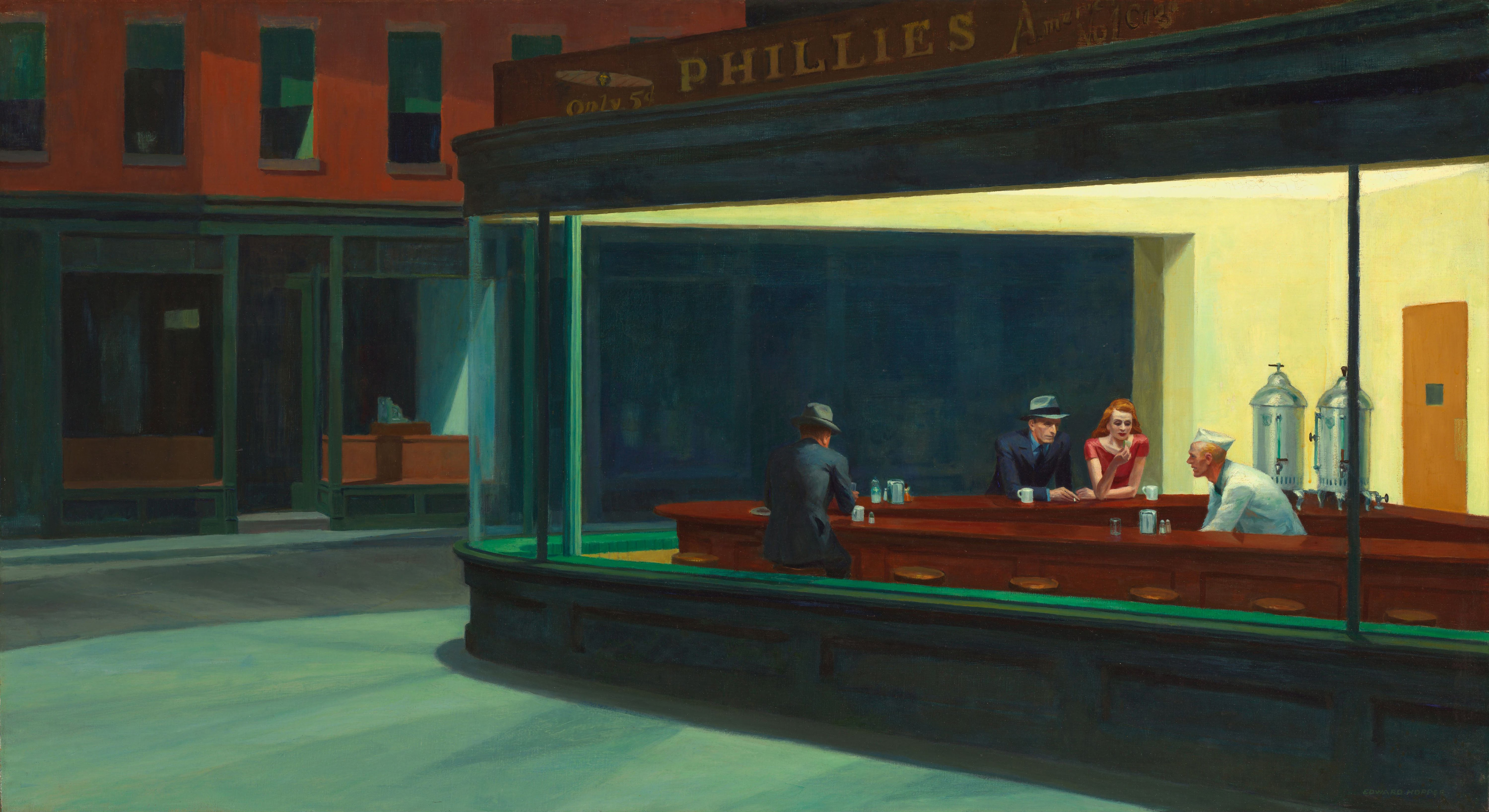
Edward Hopper, Nighthawks (1942), Cityscape

During the 1930s through the 1960s as abstract painting in America and Europe evolved into movements such as Abstract Expressionism, Color Field painting, Post painterly abstraction, Op art, hard-edge painting, Minimal art, shaped canvas painting, and Lyrical abstraction. Other artists reacted as a response to the tendency toward abstraction allowing imagery to continue through various new contexts like the Bay Area Figurative Movement in the 1950s and new forms of expressionism from the 1940s through the 1960s. In Italy during this time, Giorgio Morandi was the foremost still life painter, exploring a wide variety of approaches to depicting everyday bottles and kitchen implements. Throughout the 20th century many painters practiced Realism and used expressive imagery; practicing landscape and figurative painting with contemporary subjects and solid technique, and unique expressivity like Milton Avery, John D. Graham, Fairfield Porter, Edward Hopper, Andrew Wyeth, Balthus, Francis Bacon, Frank Auerbach, Lucian Freud, Leon Kossoff, Philip Pearlstein, Willem de Kooning, Arshile Gorky, Grace Hartigan, Robert De Niro, Sr., Elaine de Kooning and others. Along with Henri Matisse, Pablo Picasso, Pierre Bonnard, Georges Braque, and other 20th-century masters. The figurative work of Francis Bacon, Frida Kahlo, Edward Hopper, Lucian Freud Andrew Wyeth and others served as a kind of alternative to abstract expressionism. One of the most well-known images in 20th-century American art is Wyeth's painting, Christina's World, currently in the collection of the Museum of Modern Art in New York City. It depicts a woman lying on the ground in a treeless, mostly tawny field, looking up at and crawling towards a gray house on the horizon; a barn and various other small outbuildings are adjacent to the house. This tempera work, done in a realist style, is nearly always on display at the Museum of Modern Art in New York.

Arshile Gorky's portrait of what may be his friend Willem de Kooning (left) is an example of the evolution of Abstract Expressionism from the context of figure painting, cubism and surrealism. Along with his friends de Kooning and John D. Graham Gorky created bio-morphically shaped and abstracted figurative compositions that by the 1940s evolved into totally abstract paintings. Gorky's work seems to be a careful analysis of memory, emotion and shape, using line and color to express feeling and nature.

Study after Velázquez's Portrait of Pope Innocent X, 1953 is a painting by the Irish born artist Francis Bacon and is an example of Post World War II European Expressionism. The work shows a distorted version of the Portrait of Innocent X painted by the Spanish artist Diego Velázquez in 1650. The work is one of a series of variants of the Velázquez painting which Bacon executed throughout the 1950s and early 1960s, over a total of forty-five works. When asked why he was compelled to revisit the subject so often, Bacon replied that he had nothing against the Popes, that he merely "wanted an excuse to use these colours, and you can't give ordinary clothes that purple colour without getting into a sort of false fauve manner." The Pope in this version seethes with anger and aggression, and the dark colors give the image a grotesque and nightmarish appearance. The pleated curtains of the backdrop are rendered transparent, and seem to fall through the Pope's face.

After World War II the term School of Paris often referred to Tachisme, the European equivalent of American Abstract expressionism and those artists are also related to Cobra. In 1952 Michel Tapié authored the book Un Autre art which gave name and voice to Informalism. Important proponents being Jean Dubuffet, Pierre Soulages, Nicolas de Staël, Hans Hartung, Serge Poliakoff, and Georges Mathieu, among several others. During the early 1950s Dubuffet (who was always a figurative artist), and de Staël, abandoned abstraction, and returned to imagery via figuration and landscape. De Staël 's work was quickly recognised within the post-war art world, and he became one of the most influential artists of the 1950s. His return to representation (seascapes, footballers, jazz musicians, seagulls) during the early 1950s can be seen as an influential precedent for the American Bay Area Figurative Movement, as many of those abstract painters like Richard Diebenkorn, David Park, Elmer Bischoff, Wayne Thiebaud, Nathan Oliveira, Joan Brown and others made a similar move; returning to imagery during the mid-1950s. Much of de Staël 's late work – in particular his thinned, and diluted oil on canvas abstract landscapes of the mid-1950s predicts Color Field painting and Lyrical Abstraction of the 1960s and 1970s. Nicolas de Staël's bold and intensely vivid color in his last paintings predict the direction of much of contemporary painting that came after him including Pop art of the 1960s.

== Mid 20th century ==
=== Pop art ===
Andy Warhol, Campbell's Soup I, 1968

Andy Warhol, 1962, Pop Art

Pop art in America was to a large degree initially inspired by the works of Jasper Johns, Larry Rivers, and Robert Rauschenberg. Although the paintings of Gerald Murphy, Stuart Davis and Charles Demuth during the 1920s and 1930s set the table for Pop art in America. In New York City during the mid-1950s Robert Rauschenberg and Jasper Johns created works of art that at first seemed to be continuations of Abstract expressionist painting. Actually their works and the work of Larry Rivers, were radical departures from abstract expressionism especially in the use of banal and literal imagery and the inclusion and the combining of mundane materials into their work. The innovations of Johns' specific use of various images and objects like chairs, numbers, targets, beer cans and the American Flag; Rivers paintings of subjects drawn from popular culture such as George Washington crossing the Delaware, and his inclusions of images from advertisements like the camel from Camel cigarettes, and Rauschenberg's surprising constructions using inclusions of objects and pictures taken from popular culture, hardware stores, junkyards, the city streets, and taxidermy gave rise to a radical new movement in American art. Eventually by 1963 the movement came to be known worldwide as Pop art.

Pop art is exemplified by artists: Andy Warhol, Claes Oldenburg, Wayne Thiebaud, James Rosenquist, Jim Dine, Tom Wesselmann and Roy Lichtenstein among others. Lichtenstein used oil and Magna paint in his best known works, such as Drowning Girl (1963), which was appropriated from the lead story in DC Comics' Secret Hearts #83. (Drowning Girl now is in the collection of Museum of Modern Art, New York.) Also featuring thick outlines, bold colors and Ben-Day dots to represent certain colors, as if created by photographic reproduction. Lichtenstein would say of his own work: Abstract Expressionists "put things down on the canvas and responded to what they had done, to the color positions and sizes. My style looks completely different, but the nature of putting down lines pretty much is the same; mine just don't come out looking calligraphic, like Pollock's or Kline's." Pop art merges popular and mass culture with fine art, while injecting humor, irony, and recognizable imagery and content into the mix. In October 1962 the Sidney Janis Gallery mounted The New Realists the first major Pop art group exhibition in an uptown art gallery in New York City. Sidney Janis mounted the exhibition in a 57th Street storefront near his gallery at 15 E. 57th Street. The show sent shockwaves through the New York School and reverberated worldwide. Earlier in the fall of 1962 a historically important and ground-breaking New Painting of Common Objects exhibition of Pop art, curated by Walter Hopps at the Pasadena Art Museum sent shock waves across the Western United States. Campbell's Soup Cans (sometimes referred to as 32 Campbell's Soup Cans) is the title of an Andy Warhol work of art that was produced in 1962. It consists of thirty-two canvases, each measuring 20 inches in height x 16 inches in width (50.8 x 40.6 cm) and each consisting of a painting of a Campbell's Soup can—one of each canned soup variety the company offered at the time. The individual paintings were produced with a semi-mechanised silkscreen process, using a non-painterly style. They helped usher in Pop art as a major art movement that relied on themes from popular culture. These works by Andy Warhol are repetitive and they are made in a non-painterly commercial manner.

Earlier in England in 1956 the term Pop Art was used by Lawrence Alloway for paintings that celebrated consumerism of the post World War II era. This movement rejected Abstract expressionism and its focus on the hermeneutic and psychological interior, in favor of art which depicted, and often celebrated material consumer culture, advertising, and iconography of the mass production age. The early works of David Hockney whose paintings emerged from England during the 1960s like A Bigger Splash, and the works of Richard Hamilton, Peter Blake, and Eduardo Paolozzi, are considered seminal examples in the movement.

While in the downtown scene in New York's East Village 10th Street galleries artists were formulating an American version of Pop art. Claes Oldenburg had his storefront, and the Green Gallery on 57th Street began to show Tom Wesselmann and James Rosenquist. Later Leo Castelli exhibited other American artists including the bulk of the careers of Andy Warhol and Roy Lichtenstein and his use of Benday dots, a technique used in commercial reproduction and seen in ordinary comic books and in paintings like Drowning Girl, 1963, in the gallery above. There is a connection between the radical works of Duchamp, and Man Ray, the rebellious Dadaists – with a sense of humor; and Pop Artists like Alex Katz (who became known for his parodies of portrait photography and suburban life), Claes Oldenburg, Andy Warhol, Roy Lichtenstein and the others.

=== Art Brut, New Realism, Bay Area Figurative Movement, Neo-Dada, Photorealism ===
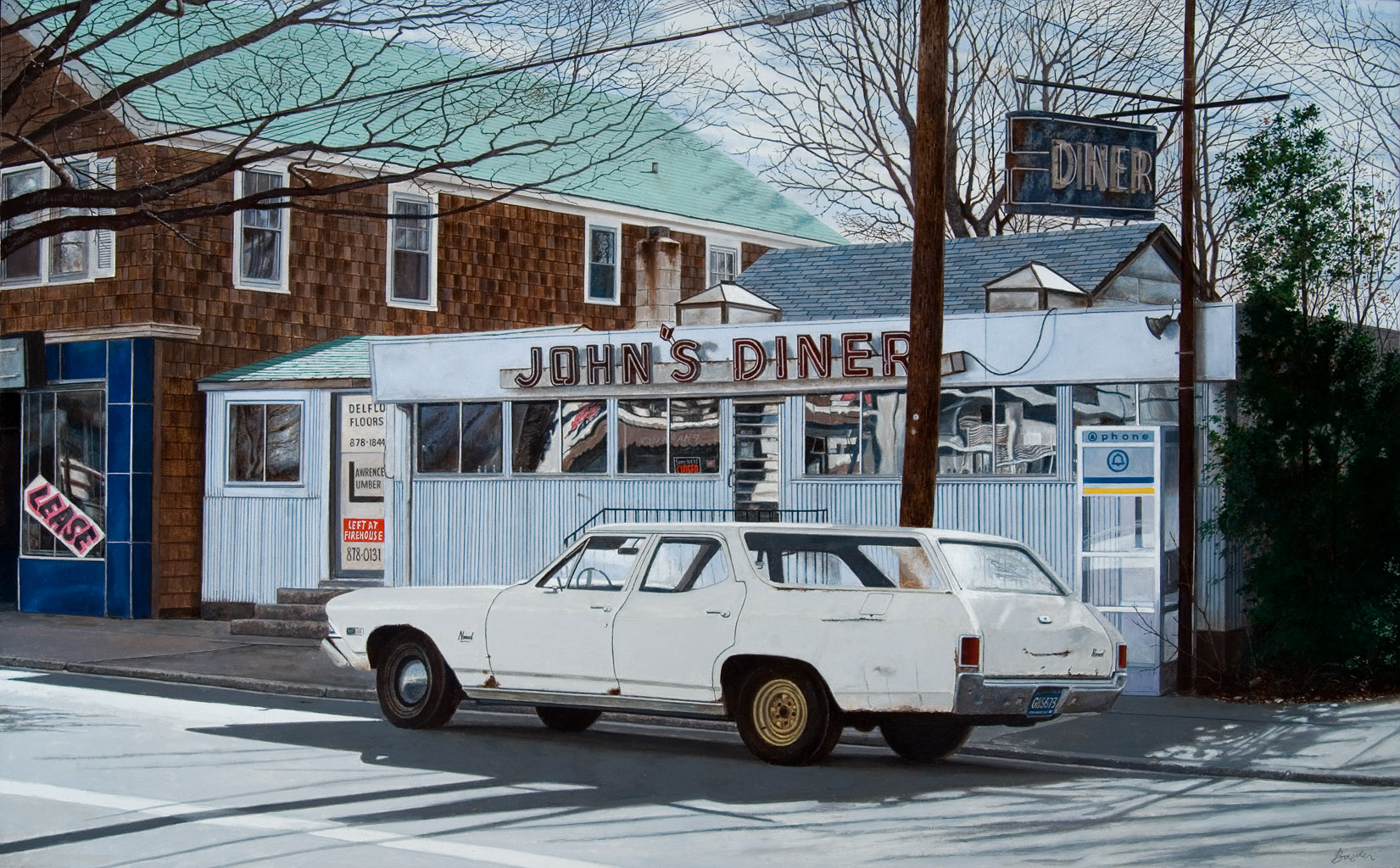
John Baeder, Photorealism

During the 1950s and 1960s as abstract painting in America and Europe evolved into movements such as Color Field painting, Post painterly abstraction, Op art, hard-edge painting, Minimal art, shaped canvas painting, Lyrical Abstraction, and the continuation of Abstract expressionism. Other artists reacted as a response to the tendency toward abstraction with Art brut, as seen in Court les rues, 1962, by Jean Dubuffet, Fluxus, Neo-Dada, New Realism, allowing imagery to re-emerge through various new contexts like Pop art, the Bay Area Figurative Movement (a prime example is Diebenkorn's Cityscape I,(Landscape No. 1), 1963, Oil on canvas, 60 1/4 x 50 1/2 inches, collection: San Francisco Museum of Modern Art), and later in the 1970s Neo-expressionism. The Bay Area Figurative Movement of whom David Park, Elmer Bischoff, Nathan Oliveira and Richard Diebenkorn whose painting Cityscape 1, 1963 is a typical example were influential members flourished during the 1950s and 1960s in California. Although throughout the 20th-century painters continued to practice Realism and use imagery, practicing landscape and figurative painting with contemporary subjects and solid technique, and unique expressivity like Milton Avery, Edward Hopper, Jean Dubuffet, Francis Bacon, Frank Auerbach, Lucian Freud, Philip Pearlstein, and others. Younger painters practiced the use of imagery in new and radical ways. Yves Klein, Martial Raysse, Niki de Saint Phalle, David Hockney, Alex Katz, Antoni Tàpies, Malcolm Morley, Ralph Goings, Audrey Flack, Richard Estes, Chuck Close, Susan Rothenberg, Eric Fischl, John Baeder, and Vija Celmins were a few who became prominent between the 1960s and the 1980s. Fairfield Porter was largely self-taught, and produced representational work in the midst of the Abstract Expressionist movement. His subjects were primarily landscapes, domestic interiors and portraits of family, friends and fellow artists, many of them affiliated with the New York School of writers, including John Ashbery, Frank O'Hara, and James Schuyler. Many of his paintings were set in or around the family summer house on Great Spruce Head Island, Maine.

Neo-Dada is a movement that started in the 1950s and 1960s and was related to Abstract expressionism only with imagery. Featuring the emergence of combined manufactured items, with artist materials, moving away from previous conventions of painting. This trend in art is exemplified by the work of Jasper Johns and Robert Rauschenberg, whose "combines" in the 1950s were forerunners of Pop Art and Installation art, and made use of the assemblage of large physical objects, including stuffed animals, birds and commercial photography. Robert Rauschenberg, Jasper Johns, Larry Rivers, John Chamberlain, Claes Oldenburg, George Segal, Jim Dine, and Edward Kienholz among others were important pioneers of both abstraction and Pop Art; creating new conventions of art-making; they made acceptable in serious contemporary art circles the radical inclusion of unlikely materials as parts of their works of art.

=== Geometric abstraction, Op Art, Hard-Edge, Color field, Minimal Art, New Realism ===
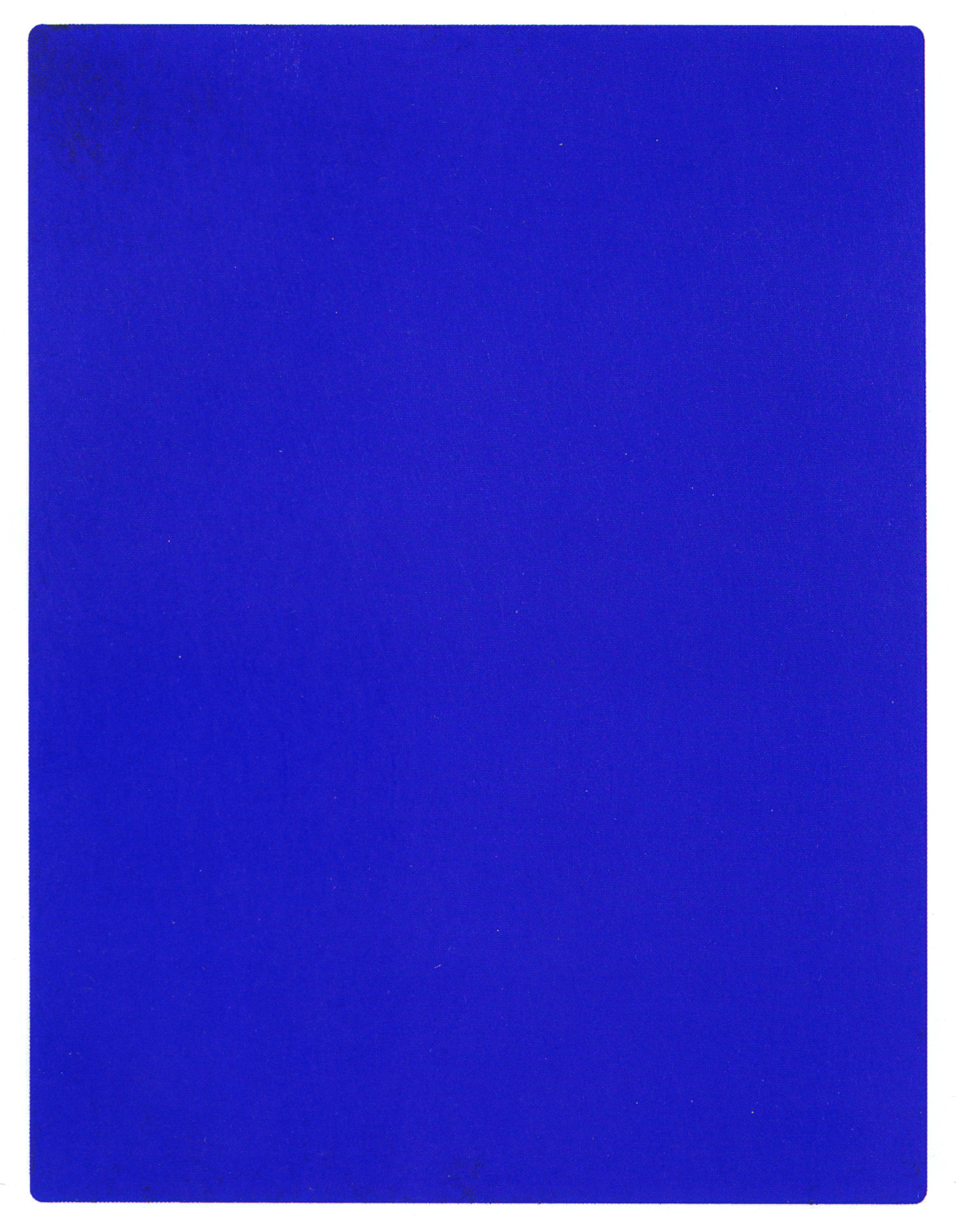
Yves Klein, 1962, New Realism

During the 1960s and 1970s abstract painting continued to develop in America through varied styles. Geometric abstraction, Op art, hard-edge painting, Color Field painting and minimal painting, were some interrelated directions for advanced abstract painting as well as some other new movements. Morris Louis was an important pioneer in advanced Colorfield painting, his work can serve as a bridge between Abstract expressionism, Colorfield painting, and Minimal Art. Two influential teachers Josef Albers and Hans Hofmann introduced a new generation of American artists to their advanced theories of color and space. Josef Albers is best remembered for his work as a Geometric abstractionist painter and theorist. Most famous are the hundreds of paintings and prints that make up the series Homage to the Square. In this rigorous series, begun in 1949, Albers explored chromatic interactions with flat colored squares arranged concentrically on the canvas. Albers' theories on art and education were formative for the next generation of artists. His own paintings form the foundation of both hard-edge painting and Op art.

Josef Albers, Hans Hofmann, Ilya Bolotowsky, Burgoyne Diller, Victor Vasarely, Bridget Riley, Richard Anuszkiewicz, Frank Stella, Morris Louis, Kenneth Noland, Ellsworth Kelly, Barnett Newman, Larry Poons, Ronald Davis, John Hoyland, Larry Zox, and Al Held are artists closely associated with Geometric abstraction, Op art, Color Field painting, and in the case of Hofmann and Newman Abstract expressionism as well. Agnes Martin, Robert Mangold, Brice Marden, Jo Baer, Robert Ryman, Richard Tuttle, Neil Williams, David Novros, Paul Mogenson, are examples of artists associated with Minimalism and (exceptions of Martin, Baer and Marden) the use of the shaped canvas also during the period beginning in the early 1960s. Many Geometric abstract artists, minimalists, and Hard-edge painters elected to use the edges of the image to define the shape of the painting rather than accepting the rectangular format. In fact, the use of the shaped canvas is primarily associated with paintings of the 1960s and 1970s that are coolly abstract, formalistic, geometrical, objective, rationalistic, clean-lined, brashly sharp-edged, or minimalist in character. The Bykert Gallery, and the Park Place Gallery were important showcases for Minimalism and shaped canvas painting in New York City during the 1960s.

In 1965, an exhibition called The Responsive Eye, curated by William C. Seitz, was held at the Museum of Modern Art, in New York City. The works shown were wide-ranging, encompassing the Minimalism of Frank Stella, the Op art of Larry Poons, the work of Alexander Liberman, alongside the masters of the Op Art movement: Victor Vasarely, Richard Anuszkiewicz, Bridget Riley and others. The exhibition focused on the perceptual aspects of art, which result both from the illusion of movement and the interaction of color relationships. Op art, also known as optical art, is a style present in some paintings and other works of art that use optical illusions. Op art is also closely akin to geometric abstraction and hard-edge painting. Although sometimes the term used for it is perceptual abstraction. Op art is a method of painting concerning the interaction between illusion and picture plane, between understanding and seeing. Op art works are abstract, with many of the better known pieces made in only black and white. When the viewer looks at them, the impression is given of movement, hidden images, flashing and vibration, patterns, or alternatively, of swelling or warping.

=== Shaped canvas, Washington color school, abstract illusionism, lyrical abstraction ===
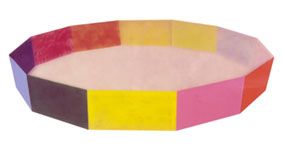
Ronald Davis 1968, Abstract Illusionism

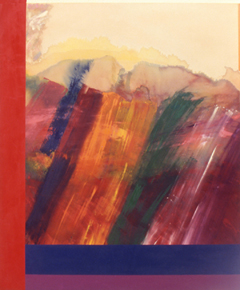
Ronnie Landfield, 1971, Lyrical Abstraction

Color Field painting clearly pointed toward a new direction in American painting, away from abstract expressionism. Color Field painting is related to Post-painterly abstraction, Suprematism, Abstract Expressionism, Hard-edge painting and Lyrical Abstraction.

Color Field painting sought to rid art of superfluous rhetoric. Artists like Clyfford Still, Mark Rothko, Hans Hofmann, Morris Louis, Jules Olitski, Kenneth Noland, Helen Frankenthaler, Larry Zox, and others often used greatly reduced references to nature, and they painted with a highly articulated and psychological use of color. In general these artists eliminated recognizable imagery. Certain artists made references to past or present art, but in general color field painting presents abstraction as an end in itself. In pursuing this direction of modern art, artists wanted to present each painting as one unified, cohesive, monolithic image. Gene Davis along with Kenneth Noland, Morris Louis and several others was a member of the Washington Color School painters who began to create Color Field paintings in Washington, D.C. during the 1950s and 1960s, Black, Grey, Beatis a large vertical stripe painting and typical of Gene Davis's work.

Frank Stella, Kenneth Noland, Ellsworth Kelly, Barnett Newman, Ronald Davis, Neil Williams, Robert Mangold, Charles Hinman, Richard Tuttle, David Novros, and Alvin Loving are examples of artists associated with the use of the shaped canvas during the period beginning in the early 1960s. Many Geometric abstract artists, minimalists, and Hard-edge painters elected to use the edges of the image to define the shape of the painting rather than accepting the rectangular format. In fact, the use of the shaped canvas is primarily associated with paintings of the 1960s and 1970s that are coolly abstract, formalistic, geometrical, objective, rationalistic, clean-lined, brashly sharp-edged, or minimalist in character. From 1960 Frank Stella produced paintings in aluminium and copper paint and are his first works using shaped canvases (canvases in a shape other than the traditional rectangle or square), often being in L, N, U or T-shapes. These later developed into more elaborate designs, in the Irregular Polygon series (67), for example. Also in the 1960s, Stella began to use a wider range of colors, typically arranged in straight or curved lines. Later he began his Protractor Series (71) of paintings, in which arcs, sometimes overlapping, within square borders are arranged side-by-side to produce full and half circles painted in rings of concentric color. Harran II, 1967, is an example of the Protractor Series. These paintings are named after circular cities he had visited while in the Middle East earlier in the 1960s. The Irregular Polygon canvases and Protractor series further extended the concept of the shaped canvas.

The Andre Emmerich Gallery, the Leo Castelli Gallery, the Richard Feigen Gallery, and the Park Place Gallery were important showcases for Color Field painting, shaped canvas painting and Lyrical Abstraction in New York City during the 1960s. There is a connection with post-painterly abstraction, which reacted against abstract expressionisms' mysticism, hyper-subjectivity, and emphasis on making the act of painting itself dramatically visible – as well as the solemn acceptance of the flat rectangle as an almost ritual prerequisite for serious painting. During the 1960s Color Field painting and Minimal art were often closely associated with each other. In actuality by the early 1970s both movements became decidedly diverse.

Another related movement of the late 1960s, Lyrical Abstraction (the term being coined by Larry Aldrich, the founder of the Aldrich Contemporary Art Museum, Ridgefield Connecticut), encompassed what Aldrich said he saw in the studios of many artists at that time. It is also the name of an exhibition that originated in the Aldrich Museum and traveled to the Whitney Museum of American Art and other museums throughout the United States between 1969 and 1971.

Lyrical Abstraction in the late 1960s is characterized by the paintings of Dan Christensen, Ronnie Landfield, Peter Young and others, and along with the Fluxus movement and Postminimalism (a term first coined by Robert Pincus-Witten in the pages of Artforum in 1969) sought to expand the boundaries of abstract painting and Minimalism by focusing on process, new materials and new ways of expression. Postminimalism often incorporating industrial materials, raw materials, fabrications, found objects, installation, serial repetition, and often with references to Dada and Surrealism is best exemplified in the sculptures of Eva Hesse. Lyrical Abstraction, Conceptual Art, Postminimalism, Earth Art, Video, Performance art, Installation art, along with the continuation of Fluxus, Abstract Expressionism, Color Field painting, Hard-edge painting, Minimal Art, Op art, Pop art, Photorealism and New Realism extended the boundaries of Contemporary Art in the mid-1960s through the 1970s. Lyrical Abstraction is a type of freewheeling abstract painting that emerged in the mid-1960s when abstract painters returned to various forms of painterly, pictorial, expressionism with a predominate focus on process, gestalt and repetitive compositional strategies in general.

Lyrical Abstraction shares similarities with Color Field painting and Abstract Expressionism especially in the freewheeling usage of paint – texture and surface. Direct drawing, calligraphic use of line, the effects of brushed, splattered, stained, squeegeed, poured, and splashed paint superficially resemble the effects seen in Abstract Expressionism and Color Field painting. However the styles are markedly different. Setting it apart from Abstract Expressionism and Action Painting of the 1940s and 1950s is the approach to composition and drama. As seen in Action Painting there is an emphasis on brushstrokes, high compositional drama, dynamic compositional tension. While in Lyrical Abstraction as exemplified by the 1971 Ronnie Landfield painting Garden of Delight (above), there is a sense of compositional randomness, all over composition, low key and relaxed compositional drama and an emphasis on process, repetition, and an all over sensibility. During the 1960s and 1970s artists as powerful and influential as Robert Motherwell, Adolph Gottlieb, Philip Guston, Lee Krasner, Cy Twombly, Robert Rauschenberg, Jasper Johns, Richard Diebenkorn, Josef Albers, Elmer Bischoff, Agnes Martin, Al Held, Sam Francis, Ellsworth Kelly, Morris Louis, Helen Frankenthaler, Gene Davis, Frank Stella, Kenneth Noland, Joan Mitchell, Friedel Dzubas, and younger artists like Brice Marden, Robert Mangold, Sam Gilliam, John Hoyland, Sean Scully, Blinky Palermo, Pat Steir, Elizabeth Murray, Larry Poons, Walter Darby Bannard, Larry Zox, Ronnie Landfield, Ronald Davis, Dan Christensen, Joan Snyder, Richard Tuttle, Ross Bleckner, Archie Rand, Susan Crile, Mino Argento and dozens of others produced vital and influential paintings.

=== Monochrome, minimalism, postminimalism ===
Brice Marden, 1966/1986, Monochrome painting

Ellsworth Kelly, The Meschers, 1951, Minimalism, Monochrome painting. Kelly was a pioneer of hard-edge painting in the 1940s and 1950s.

Artists such as Larry Poons—whose work related to Op Art with his emphasis on dots, ovals and after-images bouncing across color fields—Ellsworth Kelly, Kenneth Noland, Ralph Humphrey, Robert Motherwell and Robert Ryman had also begun to explore stripes, monochromatic and Hard-edge formats from the late 1950s through the 1960s.

Because of a tendency in Minimalism to exclude the pictorial, illusionistic and fictive in favor of the literal—as demonstrated by Robert Mangold, who understood the concept of the shape of the canvas and its relationship to objecthood—there was a movement away from painterly and toward sculptural concerns. Donald Judd had started as a painter, and ended as a creator of objects. His seminal essay, "Specific Objects" (published in Arts Yearbook 8, 1965), was a touchstone of theory for the formation of Minimalist aesthetics. In this essay, Judd found a starting point for a new territory for American art, and a simultaneous rejection of residual inherited European artistic values. He pointed to evidence of this development in the works of an array of artists active in New York at the time, including Jasper Johns, Dan Flavin and Lee Bontecou. Of "preliminary" importance for Judd was the work of George Earl Ortman, who had concretized and distilled painting's forms into blunt, tough, philosophically charged geometries. These Specific Objects inhabited a space not then comfortably classifiable as either painting or sculpture. That the categorical identity of such objects was itself in question, and that they avoided easy association with well-worn and over-familiar conventions, was a part of their value for Judd.

In a much more general sense, one might find European roots of Minimalism in the geometric abstractions painters in the Bauhaus, in the works of Piet Mondrian and other artists associated with the De Stijl movement, in Russian Constructivists and in the work of the Romanian sculptor Constantin Brâncuși. American painters such as Brice Marden and Cy Twombly show a clear European influence in their pure abstraction, minimalist painting of the 1960s. Ronald Davis polyurethane works from the late 1960s pay homage to the Broken Glass of Marcel Duchamp.

This movement was heavily criticised by high modernist formalist art critics and historians. Some anxious critics thought Minimalist art represented a misunderstanding of the modern dialectic of painting and sculpture as defined by critic Clement Greenberg, arguably the dominant American critic of painting in the period leading up to the 1960s. The most notable critique of Minimalism was produced by Michael Fried, a Greenbergian critic, who objected to the work on the basis of its "theatricality". In Art and Objecthood (published in Artforum in June 1967) he declared that the Minimalist work of art, particularly Minimalist sculpture, was based on an engagement with the physicality of the spectator. He argued that work like Robert Morris's transformed the act of viewing into a type of spectacle, in which the artifice of the act observation and the viewer's participation in the work were unveiled. Fried saw this displacement of the viewer's experience from an aesthetic engagement within, to an event outside of the artwork as a failure of Minimal art.

Ad Reinhardt, actually an artist of the Abstract Expressionist generation, but one whose reductive all-black paintings seemed to anticipate minimalism, had this to say about the value of a reductive approach to art: "The more stuff in it, the busier the work of art, the worse it is. More is less. Less is more. The eye is a menace to clear sight. The laying bare of oneself is obscene. Art begins with the getting rid of nature."

Still other important innovations in abstract painting took place during the 1960s and the 1970s characterized by monochrome painting and hard-edge painting inspired by Ad Reinhardt, Barnett Newman, Milton Resnick, and Ellsworth Kelly. Artists as diverse as Agnes Martin, Al Held, Larry Zox, Frank Stella, Larry Poons, Brice Marden and others explored the power of simplification. The convergence of Color Field painting, minimal art, hard-edge painting, Lyrical Abstraction, and postminimalism blurred the distinction between movements that became more apparent in the 1980s and 1990s. The neo-expressionism movement is related to earlier developments in abstract expressionism, neo-Dada, Lyrical Abstraction and postminimal painting.

== Late 20th century ==
=== Neo-expressionism ===
In the late 1960s the abstract expressionist painter Philip Guston helped to lead a transition from abstract expressionism to Neo-expressionism in painting, abandoning the so-called "pure abstraction" of abstract expressionism in favor of more cartoonish renderings of various personal symbols and objects. These works were inspirational to a new generation of painters interested in a revival of expressive imagery. His painting Painting, Smoking, Eating 1973, seen above in the gallery is an example of Guston's final and conclusive return to representation.

In the late 1970s and early 1980s, there was also a return to painting that occurred almost simultaneously in Italy, Germany, France and Britain. These movements were called Transavantguardia, Neue Wilde, Figuration Libre, Neo-expressionism, the school of London, and in the late 1990s the Stuckists, a group that emerged late in 1990s respectively. These painting were characterized by large formats, free expressive mark making, figuration, myth and imagination. All work in this genre came to be labeled neo-expressionism. Critical reaction was divided. Some critics regarded it as driven by profit motivations by large commercial galleries. This type of art continues in popularity into the 21st century, even after the art crash of the late 1980s.

During the late 1970s in the United States painters who began working with invigorated surfaces and who returned to imagery like Susan Rothenberg gained in popularity, especially as seen above in paintings like Horse 2, 1979. During the 1980s American artists like Eric Fischl, David Salle, Jean-Michel Basquiat (who began as a graffiti artist), Julian Schnabel, and Keith Haring, and Italian painters like Mimmo Paladino, Sandro Chia, and Enzo Cucchi, among others defined the idea of Neo-expressionism in America.

Neo-expressionism was a style of modern painting that became popular in the late 1970s and dominated the art market until the mid-1980s. It developed in Europe as a reaction against the conceptual and minimalistic art of the 1960s and 1970s. Neo-expressionists returned to portraying recognizable objects, such as the human body (although sometimes in a virtually abstract manner), in a rough and violently emotional way using vivid colours and banal colour harmonies. The veteran painters Philip Guston, Frank Auerbach, Leon Kossoff, Gerhard Richter, A. R. Penck and Georg Baselitz, along with slightly younger artists like Anselm Kiefer, Eric Fischl, Susan Rothenberg, Francesco Clemente, Damien Hirst, Jean-Michel Basquiat, Julian Schnabel, Keith Haring, and many others became known for working in this intense expressionist vein of painting.

An example of Damien Hirst's spin art, 2003

=== Contemporary painting into the 21st century ===
At the beginning of the 21st century Contemporary painting and Contemporary art in general continues in several contiguous modes, characterized by the idea of pluralism.

Mainstream painting has been rejected by artists of the postmodern era in favor of artistic pluralism. According to art critic Arthur Danto there is an anything goes attitude that prevails; an "everything going on", and consequently "nothing going on" syndrome; this creates an aesthetic traffic jam with no firm and clear direction and with every lane on the artistic superhighway filled to capacity.

== See also ==
- Art periods
- Australian art
- Contemporary art
- Hierarchy of genres
- History of art
- History of painting
- History painting
- Indian painting
- Japonism
- Lists of painters
- Lives of the Most Excellent Painters, Sculptors, and Architects
- Modern art
- Modernism
- Painting
- Painting in the Americas before European colonization
- Renaissance art
- Self-portrait
- Visual art of the United States
- Visual arts by indigenous peoples of the Americas
- Western painting
