= Eiffel Tower (Delaunay series) =

Painting series by Robert Delaunay

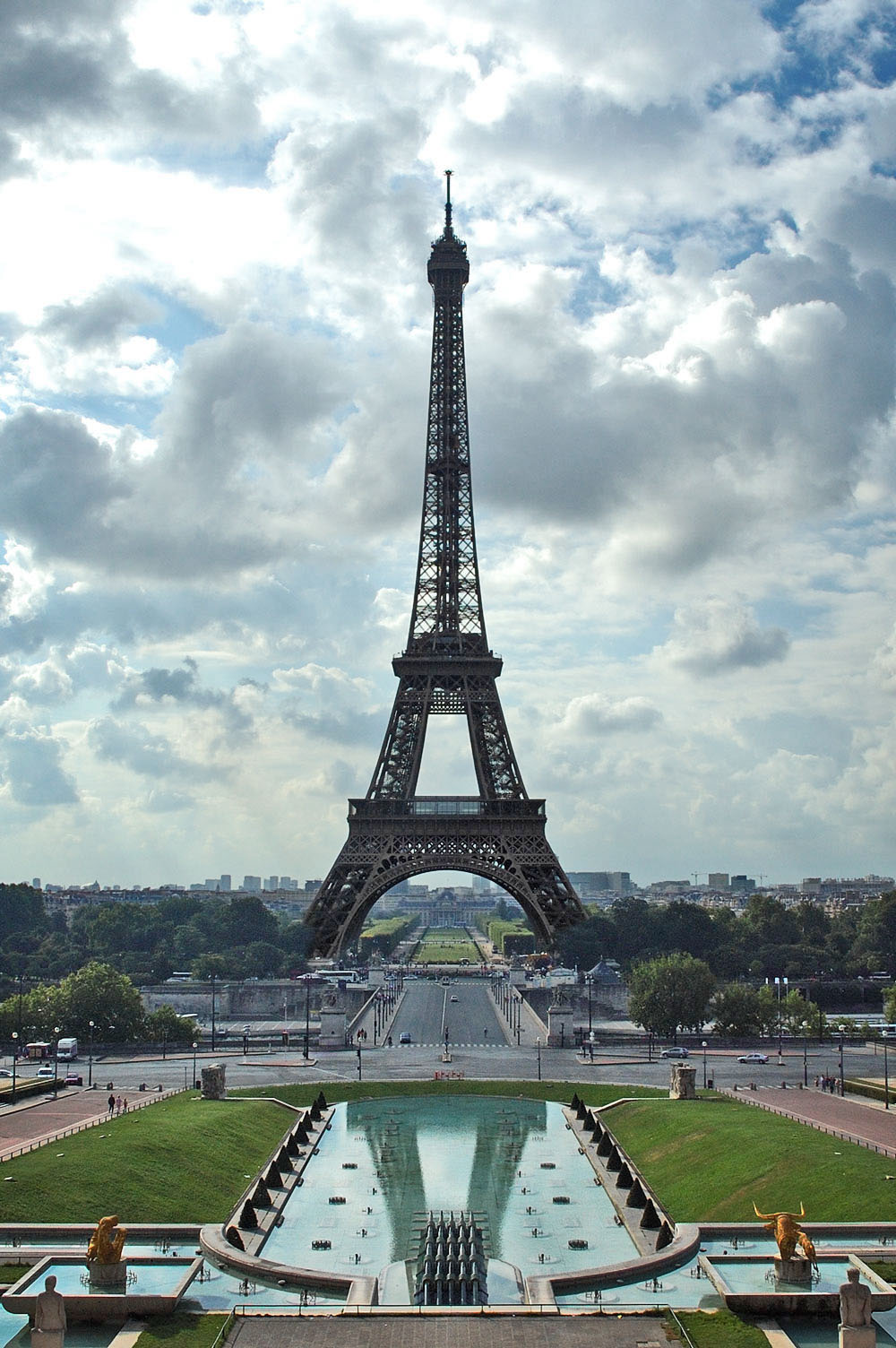
The Eiffel Tower in Paris, which inspired the series

The Eiffel Tower series of Robert Delaunay (1885–1941) is a cycle of paintings and drawings of the Eiffel Tower.

The series was painted in an emerging Orphist style, an art movement co-founded by Robert and Sonia Delaunay and František Kupka that added bright colors and increased abstraction to Cubism. The Eiffel Tower series sits chronologically and stylistically between the artist's Saint-Séverin series and Windows series.

== Course of style over series ==
=== List of works ===
Year	Image	Title	Collection
1909–12, original series
1909		La Tour à l'univers s'adresse	Philadelphia Museum of Art
1909–10		La Tour Eiffel	Staatliche Kunsthalle Karlsruhe
1910		La tour aux rideaux	Kunstsammlung Nordrhein-Westfalen
1910		Tour Eiffel aux arbres	Solomon R. Guggenheim Museum
1911		Tour Eiffel	Solomon R. Guggenheim Museum
1911		Champs de Mars: The Red Tower	Art Institute of Chicago
1911–12		La Tour Rouge	Solomon R. Guggenheim Museum
1911–12		Les trois Grâces (étude pour "La Ville de Paris")	Private collection
1912		La Ville de Paris	Musée d'Art Moderne de la Ville de Paris
1920s, return to theme
1922		La Tour Eiffel et jardin du champs de mars	Hirshhorn Museum and Sculpture Garden
1922		La Tour Eiffel	Hirshhorn Museum and Sculpture Garden
1924		La Tour Eiffel	Dallas Museum of Art
1926		La Tour Eiffel	Musée d'Art Moderne de la Ville de Paris
1926		La Tour Eiffel	Musée d'Art Moderne de la Ville de Paris
1926–28		La Tour Eiffel	Solomon R. Guggenheim Museum

== Legacy ==
Delaunay's Eiffel Tower series is evoked in architectural paintings of other iconic buildings by his contemporary, the New York artist John Marin, in his Woolworth Building, No. 31 of 1912, and later by the Ontario artist Greg Curnoe's CN Tower series of the 1970s and 1980s.

The 1913 artist's book La prose du Transsibérien et de la Petite Jehanne de France, a collaborative work between Sonia Delaunay and the poet Blaise Cendrars, forms an epic narrative of a Trans-Siberian Railway journey that concludes in Paris at a Simultanist Eiffel Tower. They had announced a plan to sell 150 copies of the book, which would equal in height the Tower itself.

The Russian film director Sergei Eisenstein's appreciation of Delaunay's work informed his Soviet montage theory, as he imagined developing cinematically "a dynamic fusion of a series, moving past the spectator, of those hundred views of the Eiffel Tower" rather than a "summation within a single canvas".

Cendrars's 1924 essay on Robert Delaunay describes his feminization of the Tower, and Sonia Delaunay described the Eiffel Tower as her husband's "Eve future"

A 1911 painting from the series is featured in the 1980 BBC series 100 Great Paintings.
