= Synchromism =

Art movement

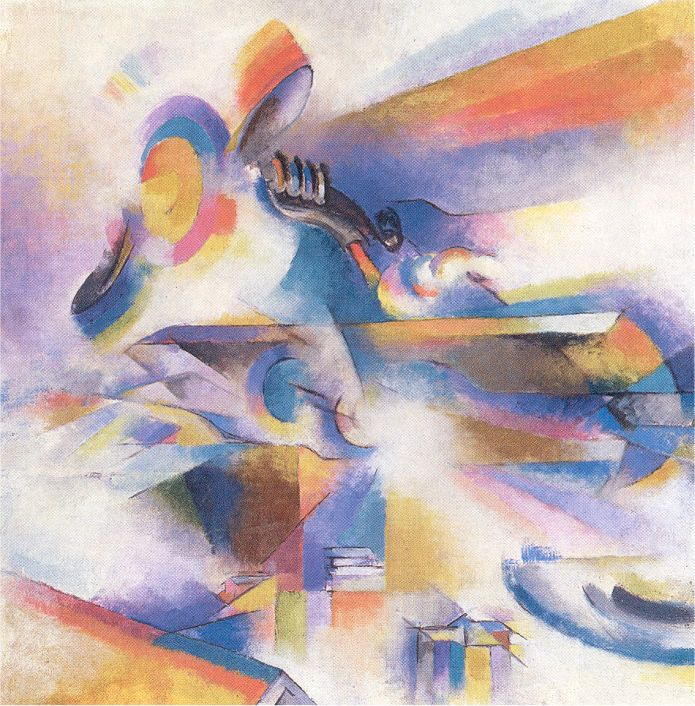
Stanton Macdonald-Wright, Airplane Synchromy in Yellow-Orange, 1920, oil on canvas, Metropolitan Museum of Art, New York

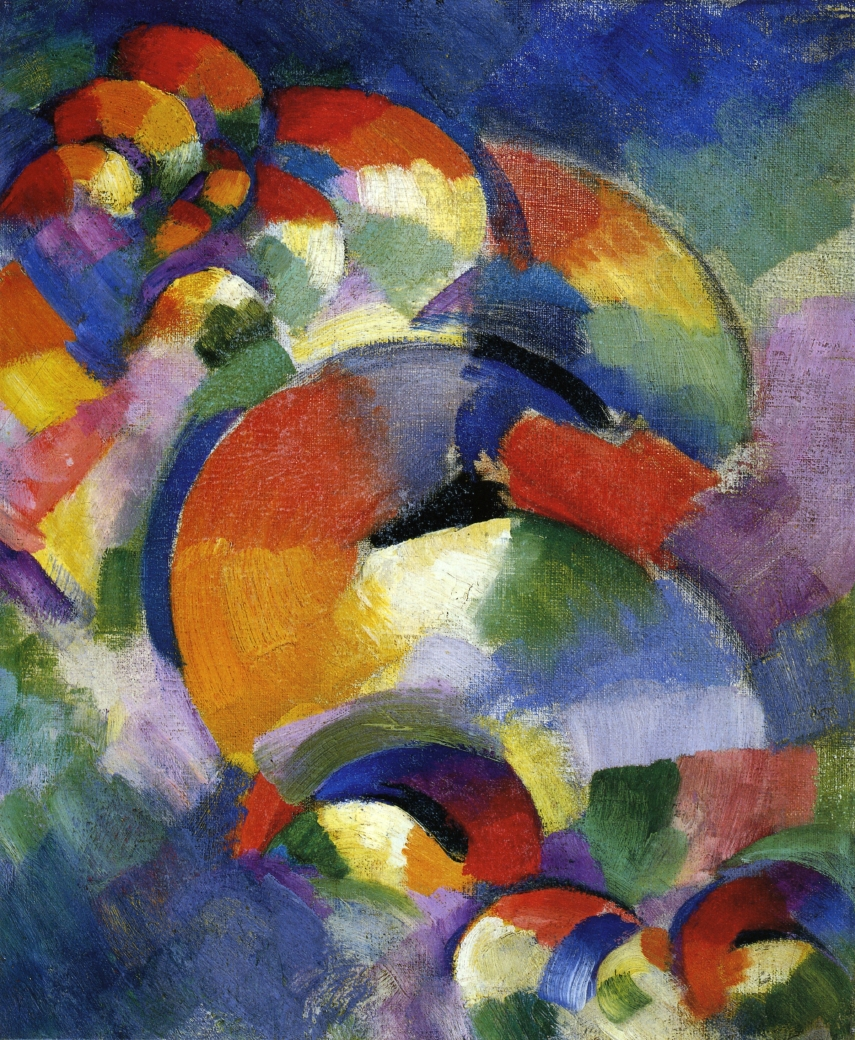
Morgan Russell, Cosmic Synchromy (1913–14), oil on canvas, 41.28 centimetres (16.25 in) × 33.34 centimetres (13.13 in), Munson-Williams-Proctor Arts Institute

Synchromism was an art movement founded in 1912 by American artists Stanton Macdonald-Wright (1890–1973) and Morgan Russell (1886–1953). Their abstract "synchromies," based on an approach to painting that analogized color to music, were among the first abstract paintings in American art. Though it was short-lived and did not attract many adherents, Synchromism became the first American avant-garde art movement to receive international attention.

One of the difficulties inherent in describing Synchromism as a coherent style is connected to the fact that some Synchromist works are purely abstract while others include representational imagery.

== Theory and style ==
Synchromism is based on the idea that color and sound are similar phenomena and that the colors in a painting can be orchestrated in the same harmonious way that a composer arranges notes in a symphony. Macdonald-Wright and Russell believed that, by painting in color scales, their visual work could evoke the same complex sensations as music. As Macdonald-Wright said,"Synchromism simply means 'with color' as symphony means 'with sound.'" The phenomenon of "hearing" a color or the pairing of two or more senses--synesthesia—was also central to the work of Wassily Kandinsky, who was developing his own synesthetic paintings, or "compositions," in Europe at approximately the same time.

The abstract "synchromies" are based on color scales, using rhythmic color forms with advancing and reducing hues. They typically have a central vortex and explode in complex color harmonies. The Synchromists avoided using atmospheric perspective or line, relying solely on color and shape to express form. Macdonald-Wright and Russell were among a number of avant-garde artists at work in the period immediately before World War I who believed that realism in the visual arts had long since reached a point of exhaustion and that, to be meaningful in the modern world, painting needed to sever any ties to older ideas about perspective and to literary or anecdotal content.

The earliest Synchromist works were similar to Fauvist paintings. The multi-colored shapes of Synchromist paintings also loosely resembled those found in the Orphism of Robert and Sonia Delaunay. Macdonald-Wright insisted, however, that Synchromism was a unique art form and "has nothing to do with Orphism and anybody who has read the first catalogue of Synchromism ... would realize that we poked fun at Orphism." The Synchromists' debts to Orphism remain a source of debate among art historians. Their approach more clearly owed something to Cubism. The Synchromists made use of the broken planes of the Cubists, but their lavishly colored areas of paint sometimes looked, as the art historian Abraham Davidson has described them, like "eddies of mist, the droplets of which collect to form parts of a straining torso....To find anything like this in American painting one has to wait for the color-field canvases of Jules Olitski in the 1960s."

== History ==
Synchromism was developed by Stanton Macdonald-Wright and Morgan Russell while they were studying in Paris during the early 1910s. In 1907, Stanton Macdonald-Wright studied the ideas of optical scientists such as Michel-Eugene Chevreul, Hermann von Helmholtz, and Ogden Rood in order to further develop color theory influenced by musical harmonies. Then from 1911 to 1913, they both studied under the Canadian painter Percyval Tudor-Hart, whose color theory connected qualities of color to qualities of music, such as tone to hue and intensity to saturation. Also influential upon Macdonald-Wright and Russell were the Impressionists, Cézanne and Matisse with their emphasis of color over drawing. In addition to the Cubists and Impressionists, Macdonald-Wright and Russell were also inspired by artists such as Émile Bernard, who was a Cloisonnist, and the Synthetist Paul Gauguin for their unique explorations of the properties and effects of color. Russell coined the term "Synchromism" in 1912, in an express attempt to convey the linkage of painting and music.

The first Synchromist painting, Russell's Synchromy in Green, exhibited at the Paris Salon des Indépendants in 1913. Later that year, the first Synchromist exhibition by Macdonald-Wright and Russell was shown in Munich. Exhibitions followed in Paris in October 1913 and in New York in March 1914. Macdonald-Wright moved back to the United States in 1914, but he and Russell continued separately to paint abstract synchromies. Synchromism remained influential among artists well into the 1920s, though its purely abstract period was relatively brief. Many synchromies of the late 1910s and 1920s contain representational elements. At no time, though, did Macdonald-Wright or Russell achieve the level of critical or commercial success they had hoped for when they introduced Synchromism to the United States. It was not until after Russell's death and late in Macdonald-Wright's life that extensive museum and scholarly attention was paid to their highly original achievements. Other American painters who experimented with Synchromism include Thomas Hart Benton (1889–1975), Andrew Dasburg (1887–1979), Patrick Henry Bruce (1880–1936), and Albert Henry Krehbiel (1873–1945).

The earliest extended discussion of Synchromism appeared in the book Modern Painting: Its Tendency and Meaning (1915) by Willard Huntington Wright. Wright was a literary editor and art critic and the brother of Stanton Macdonald-Wright, and the book was secretly co-authored by Stanton. It surveyed the major modern art movements from Manet to Cubism, praised the work of Cézanne (at the time relatively unknown in the United States), denigrated "lesser Moderns" such as Kandinsky and the Futurists (and, of course, the Orphists), and predicted a coming age in which color abstraction would supplant representational art. Synchromism is presented in the book as the culminating point in the evolution of modernism. Willard Huntington Wright never acknowledged that he was writing about his own brother's work.

Three other extended treatments of Synchromism can be found in the catalogue by Gail Levin that accompanied a major traveling exhibition organized the Whitney Museum of American Art in 1978, Synchromism and American Color Abstraction, 1910–1925, in Marilyn Kushner's catalogue for a 1990 Morgan Russell retrospective at the Montclair Museum, and in Color, Myth, and Music: Stanton Macdonald-Wright and Synchromism by Will South, a catalogue-biography published in conjunction with a three-museum exhibition of the artist's work in 2001. Levin and South are the two art historians most responsible for attracting scholarly and public attention to Synchromism, a movement that has often occupied a minor place in twentieth-century art-history textbooks.

== Sources ==
- Brown, Milton. American Painting from the Armory Show to the Depression. Princeton: Princeton University Press, 1955.
- Davidson, Abraham A. Early American Modernist Painting, 1910–1935. New York: DaCapo, 1994.
- Kushner, Marilyn. Morgan Russell. New York: Hudson Hills Press, 1990.
- Hughes, Robert. American Visions: The Epic History of Art in America. New York: Knopf, 1997.
- Hunter, Sam. Modern American Painting and Sculpture. New York: Dell, 1959.
- Levin, Gail. Synchromism and American Color Abstraction, 1910–1925. New York: George Braziller, 1978.
- Loughery, John. Alias S.S. Van Dine. New York: Scribners, 1992.
- South, Will. Color, Myth, and Music: Stanton Macdonald-Wright and Synchromism. Raleigh: North Carolina Museum of Art, 2001.
- Synchromism: Morgan Russell and Stanton Macdonald-Wright. New York: Hollis Taggart Galleries, 1999.
- Wright, Willard Huntington Wright. Modern Painting: Its Tendency and Meaning. New York: John Lane & Co., 1915.
