= Grace Mott Johnson =

American painter

- Born: July 28, 1882; New York City
- Died: March 12, 1967 (aged 84); Rochester, New York
- Spouse: Andrew Dasburg (married 1909-1922)

Grace Mott Johnson (July 28, 1882 – March 12, 1967) was an American sculptor known primarily for her renditions of animals. After a home education she studied at the Art Students' League and exhibited at the 1913 Armory Show. She was married to the painter Andrew Dasburg, and the couple were parts of the artistic communities of Paris, New York, and New Mexico.

== Early life ==
Johnson was born July 28, 1882, in New York City to Laura Mott Riverdale and Alfred Van Cleve Johnson, a Presbyterian minister. Her grandfather was the classical scholar Ebenezer Alfred Johnson. Her mother died two years after she was born, so she and her seven siblings were raised by her father. Her early years were spent being home-schooled on a farm in Yonkers, New York. She began drawing when she was four years old, and when the family moved to a farm in 1900 she enjoyed sketching horses and other farm animals. At the age of 22, she left home to study at the Art Students' League with sculptors Gutzon Borglum and James Earle Fraser, and also attended Birge Harrison's painting class in Woodstock. Throughout her career she would sculpt animals from memory, as she was adamant that animals could not be sketched. She would often attend circuses and farms for inspiration. In fact, for many summers she followed traveling circuses to observe the animals.

== Career ==
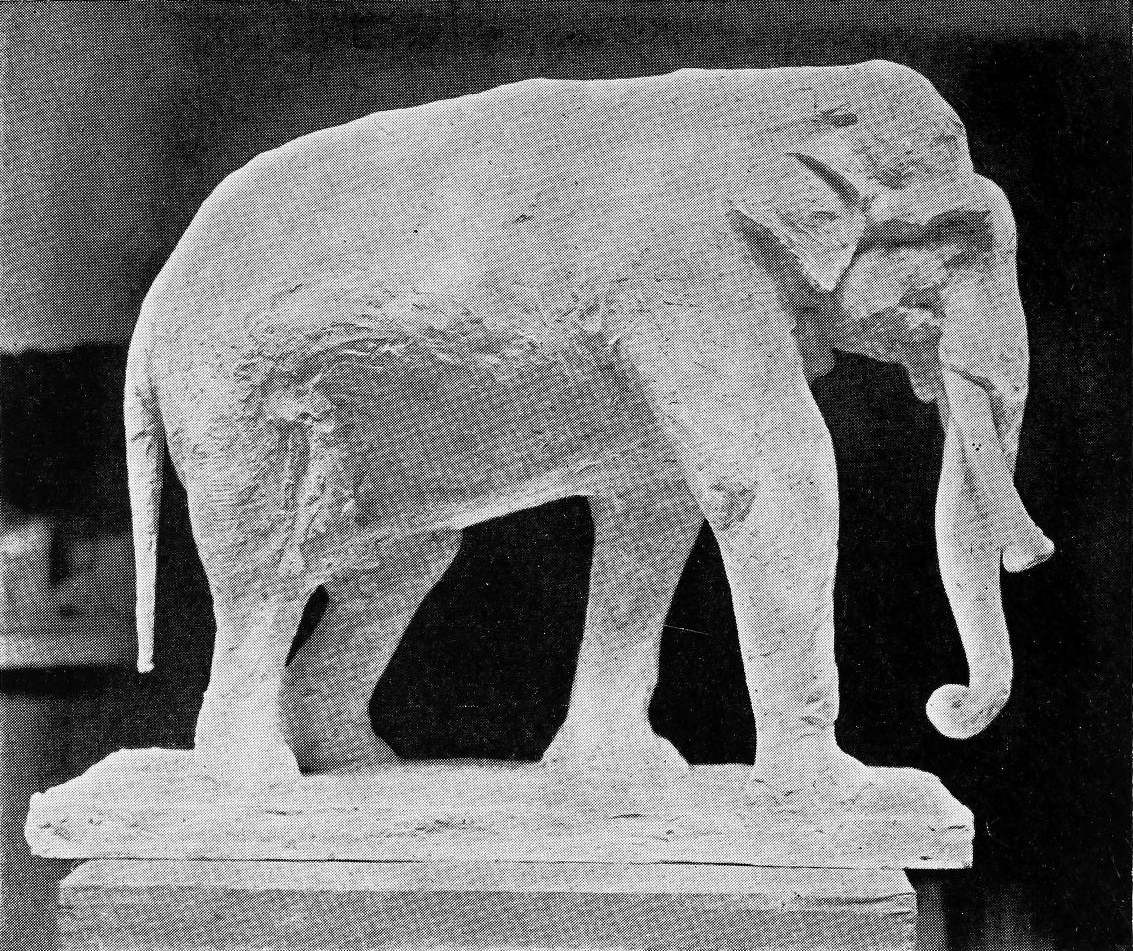
Elephant sculpture

In 1909, Johnson and painter Andrew Dasburg went to Paris and joined the modernist circle of artists living there, including Morgan Russell, Jo Davidson, and Arthur Lee. During a trip to London that same year they were married. Johnson returned to the United States early the next year, but Dasburg stayed in Paris where he met Henri Matisse, Gertrude Stein and Leo Stein, and became influenced by the paintings of Cézanne and Cubism. He returned to Woodstock, New York, in August and he and Johnson became active members of the artist community. In 1911, their son Alfred was born. Both Dasburg and Johnson showed several works at the legendary Armory Show in 1913. After several years of exhibiting single pieces, her first general exhibition was in 1917 at the studio of Gertrude Vanderbilt Whitney. She also had joint exhibitions at the Whitney Studio Club, co-exhibiting with Florence Lucius (1919) and Lila Wheelock (1923).

Dasburg and Johnson lived apart for most of their marriage. By 1917, they had separated and Dasburg began teaching painting in Woodstock and in New York City. In 1918, he was invited to Taos, New Mexico, by Mabel Dodge, where she was associated with Dodge's artist colony. Returning in 1919, Johnson joined him there for a period of time. In 1922, Dasburg and Johnson divorced.

Grace Mott Johnson lived in the Johnson family home in Yonkers, New York, during the 1920s, moving to Pleasantville, New York, in 1927. In 1924 she went to Egypt to study ancient Egyptian sculpture. In 1929 she had a solo exhibition of her sculpture and drawings at the Art Gallery of the Museum of New Mexico. During the 1930s, she became a civil rights activist. She had many friends in the arts community in Harlem and was an active representative of the NAACP. She produced a notable series of portraits of African American adults and children. She produced very little art during the last twenty years of her life.

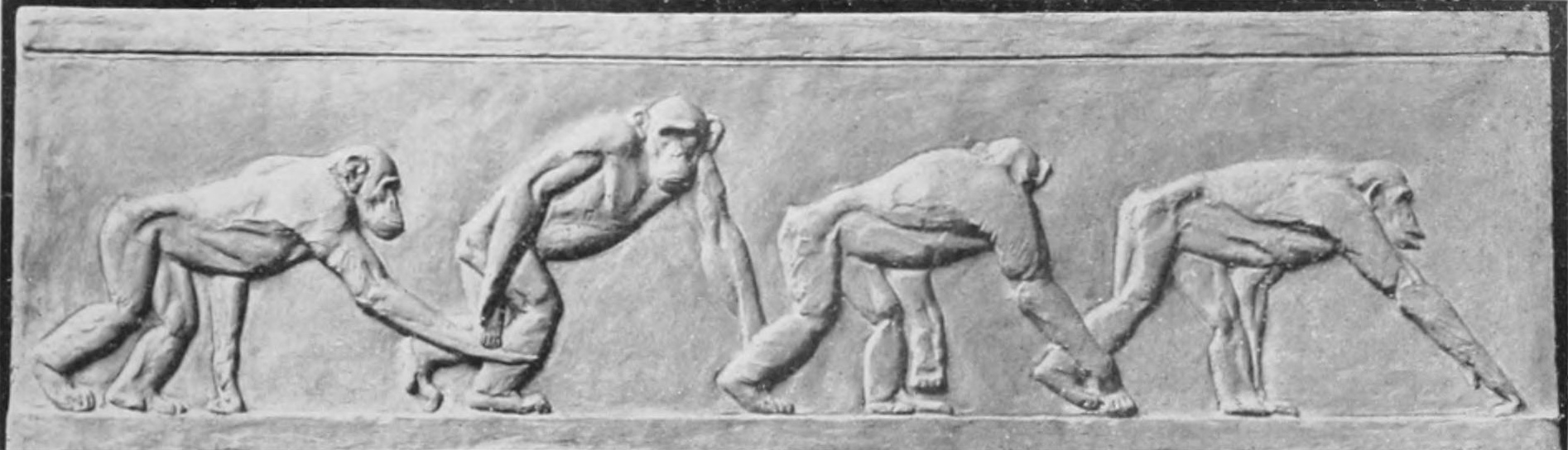
Chimpanzees, 1912

Writings by Johnson were also found which included two brief autobiographical writings which described her early life. These included what it was like living on a farm, her interests in art and art education. She also worked on a home-made magazine called The Johnson Monthly which she made with her siblings, the illustrations in the magazine were done by Johnson. Additionally, she had written poems, writings about civil rights, and loose diary-style writings which expressed her thoughts. Her sketchbooks mainly included charcoal and pencil drawings of animals, landscapes, and other designs. Preliminary sketches of her animal sculptures were also included as well as sketches of her son.

== Awards ==
In 1917, Johnson was awarded the Macmillan Sculpture Prize at New York City's National Association of Women Painters and Sculptors. She was also awarded the Joan of Arc Medal in 1927.

== Legacy ==
Her artwork is still highly valued within the art community, with it going above estimates in auction. Her sculpture of a Grey hound sold for $3,884 at auction in 2006, which was 56% above the estimate. Her portrait of a hunting dog sold for 549% above estimated auction. Her bronze figure of a lamb sold for $2,420 when the estimate was $1,000-$1,500.
