= Andrew Dasburg =

American artist (1887–1979)

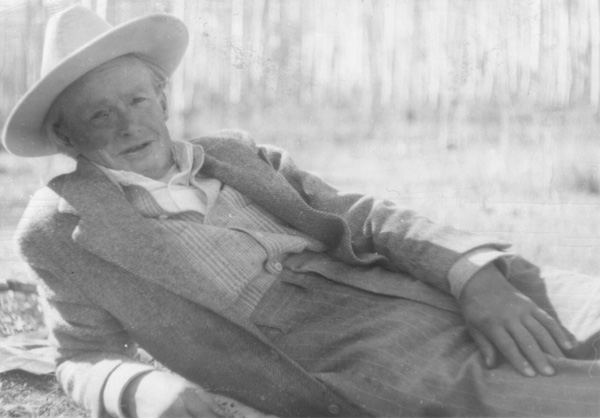
- Andrew Dasburg, c. 1940s
- Born: Andrew Michael Dasburg; May 4, 1887; Paris, France
- Died: August 13, 1979 (aged 92); Taos, New Mexico, US
- Education: Art Students League of New York
- Occupation: Artist
- Known for: Painting
- Movement: Cubism, Synchromism
- Spouses: Grace Mott Johnson (m. 1909; div. 1922); Mary Channing "Marina" Wister (m. 1933; died 1970)

Andrew Michael Dasburg (4 May 1887 – 13 August 1979) was an American modernist painter and "one of America's leading early exponents of cubism". Born in Paris and raised in New York City, he trained at the Art Students League of New York before traveling to Paris, where he encountered the work of Paul Cézanne and became deeply influenced by Cubism. He became an ardent promoter of the Cubist style and exhibited at the landmark 1913 Armory Show, where his three Cubist-oriented oil paintings were considered "daringly experimental".

Dasburg spent much of his career in New Mexico, settling first in Santa Fe and later in Taos, where he integrated the boxy traditional architectural styles of the Pueblo region into his Cubist art. He was part of a social milieu that included Georgia O'Keeffe, Gertrude Stein, and Mabel Dodge Luhan. He received the Guggenheim Fellowship in 1932 and won prizes at major international exhibitions. His works are held in the collections of the Whitney Museum of American Art, the Metropolitan Museum of Art, the New Mexico Museum of Art, and the Denver Art Museum, among others.

== Biography ==
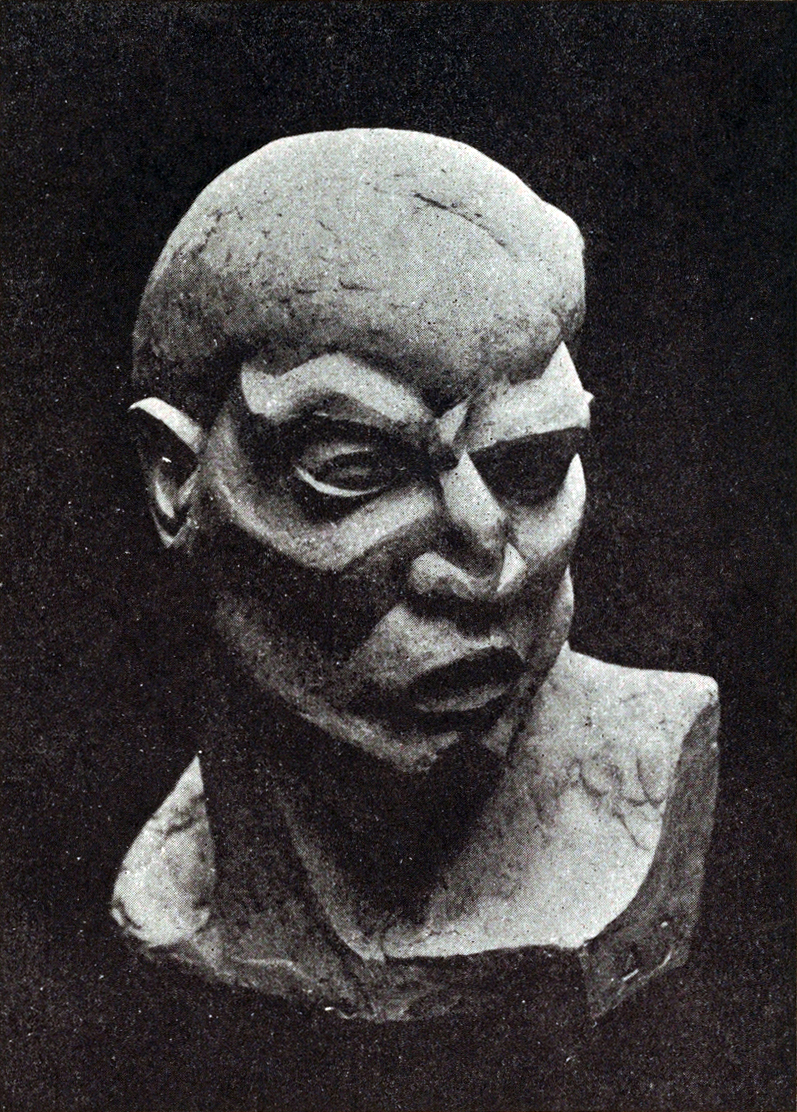
Andrew Dasburg, Lucifer, c. 1913, plaster of Paris, exhibited at the 1913 Armory Show, n. 647 of the catalogue. Dasburg extensively reworked by carving directly into a sculpture of a life-size plaster head by Arthur Lee.

Dasburg was born in 1887 in Paris. He emigrated from Germany to New York City with his widowed mother in 1892. After a severe injury, he passed the time in convalescence by sketching. In 1902 he joined the Art Students League of New York on a scholarship, where he was taught by Kenyon Cox. At the league's summer school in Woodstock, New York, he studied landscapes under L. Birge Harrison.

In 1909, Dasburg visited Paris and joined the modernist circle of artists living there, including Morgan Russell, Jo Davidson, and Arthur Lee. During a trip to London that same year he married sculptor Grace Mott Johnson. Johnson returned to the United States early the next year, but Dasburg stayed in Paris where he met Henri Matisse, Gertrude Stein and Leo Stein, and became influenced by the paintings of Paul Cézanne and Cubism. He soon became an ardent promoter of the Cubist style.

Dasburg returned to Woodstock, New York, in August and he and Johnson became active members of the artist community. In 1911, their son Alfred was born, the same year as Dasburg's first exhibition. Dasburg exhibited three oils and a sculpture at the International Exhibition of Modern Art, better known as the Armory Show, which opened in New York City's 69th Regiment Armory in 1913 and introduced astonished New Yorkers to modern art. The three Cubist-oriented oils displayed at the 1913 show were considered "daringly experimental". In the years after the Armory Show, Dasburg's works were exhibited along with those of other Modernists at Alfred Stieglitz's 291 gallery.

At the Armory Show, Dasburg exhibited the only sculpture he had ever made. Prior to the show, he extensively reworked a sculpture, originally a life-size cast plaster head by Arthur Lee, by carving facets directly into the plaster of Paris.

I asked him if I could cut it which he was glad – we were very close friends. So I carved a head and it must have been an awful-looking thing. At the time, I called it Lucifer, looked like Lucifer. At the Armory Show, they put it right up at the entrance as you came in, and here was this head on a stand.

Dasburg and Johnson lived apart for most of their marriage. By 1917, they had separated and Dasburg began teaching painting in Woodstock and in New York City. In 1918, he was invited to Taos, New Mexico, by Mabel Dodge Luhan, and returning in 1919, Johnson joined him there for a period of time. After moving to Santa Fe, New Mexico, in 1921, Dasburg integrated the boxy traditional construction styles in New Mexico into his Cubist art.

In 1924, Dasburg collaborated with a group of other artists and writers to form the Spanish and Indian Trading Company, a cooperative "curio shop" located on East San Francisco across from Santa Fe's La Fonda. In its inaugural year, the store sold Dasburg's own collection of Native American and Mexican blankets, and Witter Bynner's Navajo silver.

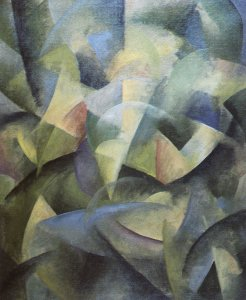
Andrew Dasburg, Improvisation, c. 1915–16

In both New York and Taos, Dasburg was part of the social milieu that included Georgia O'Keeffe and Gertrude Stein, and a close friend of Mabel Dodge Luhan. A painting named The Absence of Mabel Dodge was allegedly painted to inflame the jealousy of her then-lover, mutual friend John Reed (it was a pointed reminder of a peyote celebration in which the two had shared), and for four years Dasburg and Reed's other lover Louise Bryant carried on an affair. The elderly Dasburg appeared posthumously as himself in the movie about Reed and Bryant, Reds, although he "curiously ... does not speak of his intimacy with either". He was also involved for some time with Ida Rauh, a co-founder of the Provincetown Players, and the two of them were friends with D. H. Lawrence and his wife Frieda von Richthofen, and helped Lawrence recover from a bout of tuberculosis that nearly got him refused entry to the U.S. at the border with Mexico.

In 1933, he married poet Mary Channing "Marina" Wister, the daughter of Owen Wister.

Dasburg died in his home in Taos, New Mexico, on August 13, 1979, at age 92. Following his death, the New Mexico Museum of Art in Santa Fe held a 96-work retrospective exhibition funded in part by the National Endowment for the Arts which traveled to four other Western states. His works are in the collections of the Whitney Museum of American Art, the Metropolitan Museum of Art, New Mexico Museum of Art and the Denver Art Museum, among others.

His home in Santa Fe, New Mexico, at 520 and 524 Camino del Monte Sol, is listed on the National Register of Historic Places as a contributing building in the Camino del Monte Sol Historic District.

== Awards and honors ==
- Tulips, Second Prize, First Pan-American Exhibition of Oil Paintings at Los Angeles County Museum of Art (1925)
- Poppies, Third Prize, 16th International Exhibition of Art, Carnegie Institute of Technology (1927)
- Guggenheim Fellowship (1932)

== Exhibitions ==
- Quest for the New: Modernism in the Southwest, Lewallen Galleries, Santa Fe, NM, 2018
- Mabel Dodge Luhan & Company: American Moderns and the West, The Harwood Museum of Art, University of New Mexico, Taos, NM, 2016
- An American Modernism: Painting and Photography, New Mexico Museum of Art, Santa Fe, NM, 2015 - 2016
- Modernism Made in New Mexico, Georgia O'Keeffe Museum, Santa Fe, NM, 2015
- Southwestern Allure: The Art of the Santa Fe Art Colony, Boca Raton Museum of Art, Boca Raton, FL, 2013
- The Cubist Impulse in American Art, Gerald Peters Gallery, Santa Fe, NM, 2009
- Andrew Dasburg, 1887-1979 : a retrospective exhibition, Art Museum, University of New Mexico, Albuquerque, New Mexico, 1979

== Publications ==
- Spirited Visions: The Art of Andrew Dasburg (1887–1979), by Catherine Whitney (Author), Rebecca Friedman (Editor), Gerald P. Peters Gallery (Publisher), Santa Fe, New Mexico, December 2011, ISBN 978-0-935037-58-6
- Andrew Dasburg: His Life and Art, by Sheldon Reich, 1989, Bucknell University Press, PA, ISBN 978-0-8387-5098-8
- Modernist Painting in New Mexico 1913 - 1935, by Sharin Rohlfsen Udall, University of New Mexico Press, 1984, ISBN 0-8263-0729-9
- Andrew Dasburg, by Van Deren Coke, University of New Mexico Press, 1979, ISBN 978-0-8263-0516-9
- Andrew Dasburg, by Jerry Bywaters, American Federation of Arts, 1959, ASIN : B000BH11A0

== See also ==
- Synchromism
