= Tudor-Hart =

Tudor-Hart is a surname which is a combination of last names. Notable people with the surname include:

- Alexander Tudor-Hart (1901–1992), British medical doctor, father of Dr. Julian Tudor-Hart.
- Edith Tudor-Hart (1908–1973), Austrian-British photographer
- Julian Tudor-Hart (1927–2018), British general practitioner
- Percyval Tudor-Hart (1873–1954), Canadian painter, sculptor, teacher and restorer of paintings
