= Charles Henry (librarian) =

French librarian and editor

Charles Henry (1859–1926) was a French librarian and editor. He was born at Bollwiller, Haut-Rhin, and was educated in Paris, where in 1881 he became assistant and afterward librarian in the Sorbonne. As a specialist in the history of mathematics, he was sent to Italy to seek some manuscripts of that nature which the government wished to publish. He edited several works upon kindred subjects, as well as memoirs, letters, and other volumes, and wrote critiques upon the musical theories of Rameau and Wronski. He is also credited with the invention of several ingenious devices and instruments used in psychophysiological laboratories. He published C. Huet's correspondence under the title Un érudit, homme du monde, homme d'église, homme de cour (1880), and he issued also Problèmes de géométrie pratique (1884) and Lettres inédites de Mlle. de Lespinasse à Condorcet et à D'Alembert (1887).

Charles Henry, a mathematician, inventor, esthetician, and intimate friend of the Symbolist and anarchist writers Félix Fénéon and Gustave Kahn, met Georges Seurat, Paul Signac and Camille Pissarro during the last Impressionist exhibition in 1886. Henry would take the final step in bringing emotional associational theory into the world of artistic sensation: something that would influence greatly the Neo-Impressionists. Henry and Seurat were in agreement that the basic elements of art—the line, particle of color, like words—could be treated autonomously, each possessing an abstract value independent of one another, if so chose the artist. In 1889 Fénéon noted that Seurat knew that the line, independent of its topographical role, possesses an assessable abstract value, in addition, to the individual pieces of color, and the relation of both to the observer's emotion.

The Neo-Impressionists established what was accepted as an objective scientific basis for their painting in the domain of color. The underlying theory behind Neo-Impressionism would have a lasting effect on the works produced in the coming years by the likes of Robert Delaunay. The Cubists were to do so in both form and dynamics, and the Orphists would do so with color too. The decomposition of spectral light expressed in Neo-Impressionist color theory of Paul Signac and Charles Henry played an important role in the formulation of Orphism. Robert Delaunay, Albert Gleizes, and Gino Severini all knew Henry personally.

Late in life he filed for a patent to produce methanol from carbon monoxide and founded Société Française de Catalyse Généralisée to exploit it.

== Works ==
- Introduction à une esthétique scientifique, Paris, 1885
- La Vérité sur le Marquis de Sade, Paris, E. Dentu, 1887
- Rapporteur esthétique, Paris, Seguin, 1888
- Cercle cromatique, Paris, Verdin, 1888
- Esthétique et psychophysique, «Revue philosophique», 29, 1890
- Harmonies de formes et de couleurs, Paris, 1891
- L'esthétique des formes, «La Revue blanche», 7, 1894
- Sensation et énergie, Paris, 1910
- Mémoire et habitude, Paris, 1911
- La lumière, la couleur et la forme, «L'esprit nouveau», 1921.
- Essai de généralisation de la théorie du rayonnement: résonateurs gravitiques et résonateurs biologiques, Paris, 1924.
