= The Cathedral (painting) =

Painting by František Kupka

Katedrala, František Kupka, 1912–13

The Cathedral (Czech: Katedrála) is an abstract painting created by Czech artist František Kupka in 1912–13. The medium is oil on canvas, and the painting's dimensions are 180 × 150 cm. The painting is a part of the permanent Jan and Meda Mládek collection of Museum Kampa in Prague, Czech Republic. This painting is one of a series of abstract works that Kupka termed Vertical and Diagonal Planes. Vertical lines, running the entire length of the canvas, are intersected by diagonal lines to form rectilinear shapes of various sizes. These rectilinear shapes are composed of blocks of black, white, and a range of blue, red, purple, gray, and brown color. The large black space between the two clusters of the shapes, and the arching of the top of the right cluster, brings to the viewer's mind two stained glass windows illuminated by external light in a dark cathedral.

== Artist ==
Kupka was an abstract artist who lived during the nineteenth and twentieth centuries. Though his role in the advent of abstract art is given much less emphasis, his work is just as crucial as that of the more celebrated abstractionists including Mondrian, Kandinsky, Malevich, and Delaunay. The influential art critic Guillaume Apollinaire labeled Kupka as an Orphic artist, and Kupka claimed to begin his Orphic artwork in 1911. As Hajo Düchting writes, Apollinaire used the term Orphism to describe "a new kind of joyously sensuous art, whose roots were in Cubism and which had a tendency towards abstraction." Orphism also alluded to the myth of Orpheus and referenced the artist's creative innovation through the sensuous interplay of color and light and color and music. Kupka was not a Cubist like Picabia, Gleizes, or Metzinger, as his abstract work did not have its origins in Cubism, though he was associated and exhibited with them. While other artists later developed a theory of abstraction to explain their work, Kupka first thought up his theory and then put it into practice.

Kupka was trained by Nazarene artists in Prague and Vienna. The Nazarenes wanted to create work that recalled the monumental spiritual artwork of Germany during the Middle Ages. They believed that artwork should produce an effect on the viewer similar to that experienced when listening to religious music. The Nazarenes also thought that contemplation and philosophical thought was essential to art. Kupka arrived at abstraction with the realization that "it was possible to experience great joy and excitement in the mere contemplation of colours and lines" and the desire to create paintings that effected the viewer the way music did.

Moving to Paris in 1896 allowed Kupka to depart from Viennese influence for a time and paint with a new perspective. However, Kupka was forced to take on commissions and commercial work just to survive. Kupka was only able to completely devote his attention to his abstract development after receiving prize money from the Prague Academy in 1909.

== Inspiration for painting ==
Kupka was inspired by the shape and color present within the architecture of French cathedrals, especially in the stained glass. Kupka was greatly enamored with stained glass, and his transition into abstraction is marked by studies of light within cathedrals. Kupka studied the light that shone through the red and blue stained glass of the Chartres Cathedral in France to create The Cathedral. Kupka's fascination with cathedrals also serves as the inspiration for his other works of vertical and diagonal lines that he created at this same time. Vertical and Diagonal Planes (c. 1913–14), for example, employs the same rectilinear shapes and a similar color scheme as The Cathedral. In both of these works, the vertical lines created a sense of stability, while the diagonal lines created tension.

== Critical response and influences ==
Hilton Kramer points out that at its most basic level, Kupka's work was a depiction of specific visual materials, but it also showed a consideration of metaphysical material. Kupka was not only concerned with formal elements like line, color, and shape, and their manipulation with light, but also with spiritual, cosmological, biological, and musical forces. Kupka, influenced by the painter Karl Wilhelm Diefenbach, appreciated the abstract nature of music. Music could reach and move an audience without also having a narrative, a marker of reality, and he felt that art could do the same. He felt that through art, one could achieve "another reality." Kupka sought to transfer his heightened consciousness to his paintings so that the viewer might also reach elevated thought. Kupka seems to be sorting out this alternate reality in The Cathedral. Kupka's repetition of geometric shapes creates harmony, and the shapes act like the notes of a melody. The shapes are two-dimensional, but at the same time, they have great mass and intersect to create three-dimensional forms that almost appear to break through the canvas. The painting has significance, evokes metaphysical meaning, even before the viewer knows the title, the piece of reality. The painting is not any less effective without knowing the title.
