= Patrick Henry Bruce =

American painter

Artist Patrick Henry Bruce (3rd from left) & friends/associates in front of the entrance to a Comité des Étudiants Américains de l'École des Beaux-Arts Paris exhibition. Probably at the École des Beaux-Arts, Paris, circa 1918.

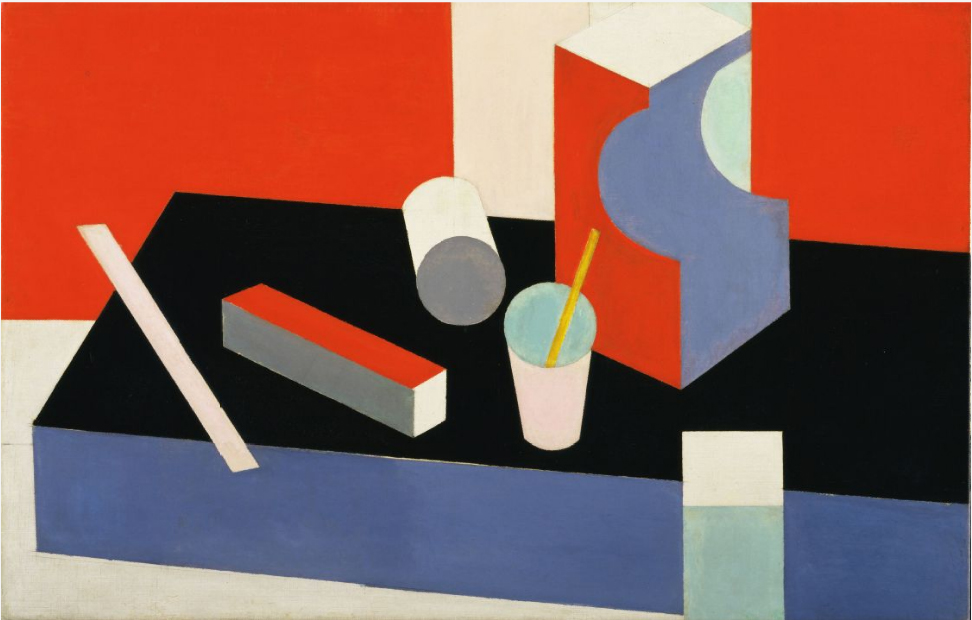
Painting, oil on canvas, 23 3/4 × 36 3/8" (60.3 × 92.4 cm)c. 1929–1930

Patrick Henry Bruce (March 25, 1881 – November 12, 1936) was an American cubist painter.

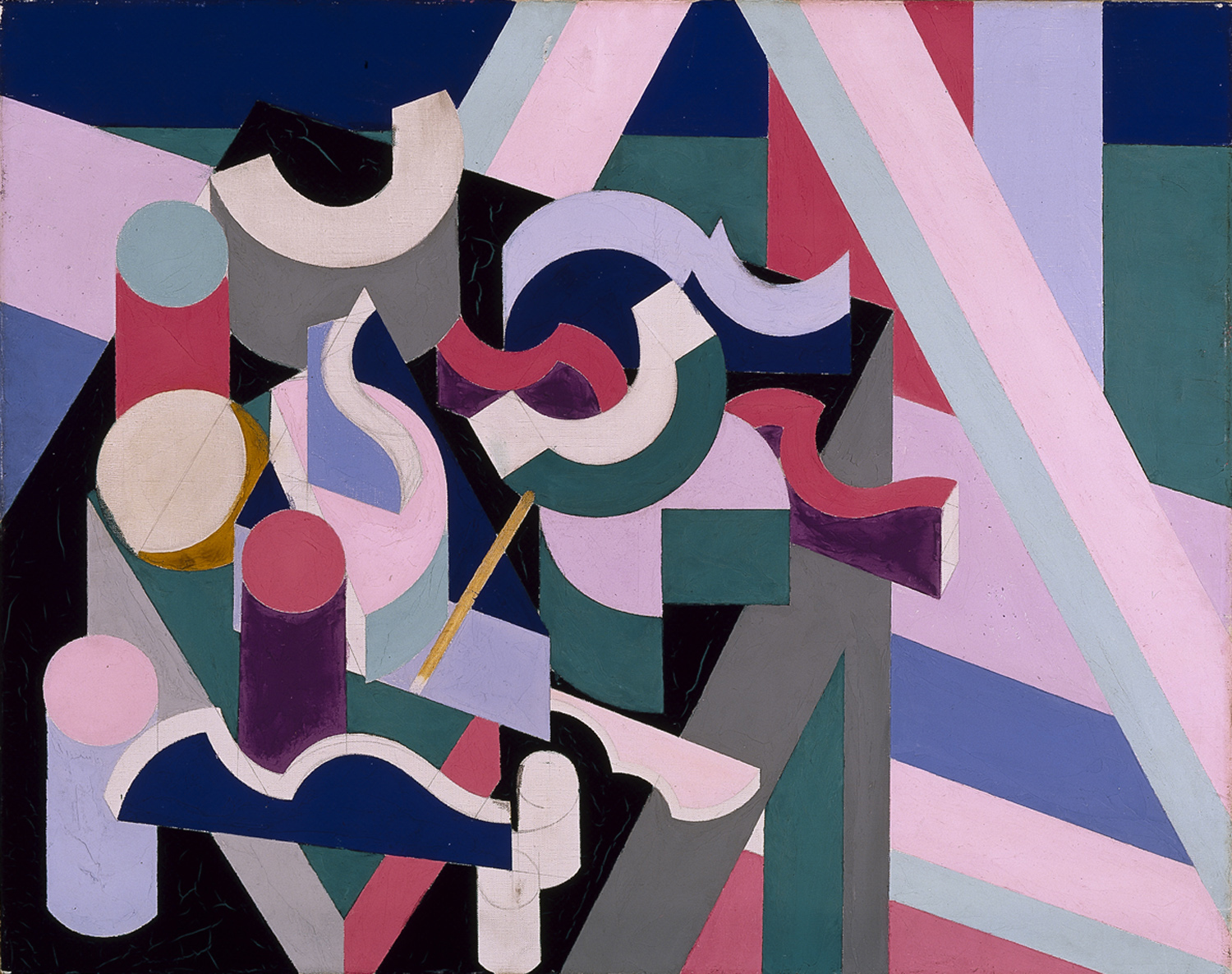
Still-life, 1924

== Biography ==
A descendant of Patrick Henry, Bruce was born in Campbell County, Virginia, the second of four children. His family had once owned a huge plantation, Berry Hill, worked by over 3,000 slaves. Berry Hill Estate originally was part of a 105,000-acre (420 km^{2}) tract granted by the English Crown in 1728 to William Byrd II. (Berry Hill is now a resort and conference center outside South Boston, Virginia and is a National Historic Landmark.) The Civil War left the Bruces' wealth greatly diminished. Bruce began taking evening classes at the Art Club of Richmond in 1898, while working in a real estate office during the daytime. His earliest known extant painting dates from 1900.

In 1902 he moved to New York, where he studied with William Merritt Chase, Robert Henri, and Kenneth Hayes Miller. By February 1904 he was in Paris, where he would live until 1933. Although his evolution toward a modernist style was gradual, his works of 1908 reveal the influence of Renoir and Cézanne, and in that year he was among the first to enroll in Matisse's school.

Bruce exhibited regularly in the Salon d'Automne, and met many of the leading artists of the early twentieth century avant garde. During a period of close friendship with Sonia and Robert Delaunay during 1912–1914 his paintings were influenced by Orphism, but Bruce never formed an attachment to any school. Although he never exhibited with the Synchromists or gave his paintings Synchromist titles, in 1916 he developed a form of abstract painting that strongly resembled Morgan Russell's synchromist compositions of muscular, flat color areas (for example, see Bruce's Composition I).

The style of his mature work anticipated the Purism developed by Léger and Ozenfant in the 1920s. In his paintings of 1918 and later, hard-edged geometric forms are arranged as on a tabletop and rendered in evenly applied, flat colors. His work was admired by Marcel Duchamp and may have influenced the style adopted by his former teacher, Matisse, in his mural La Danse (1932–33, in the Barnes Foundation, Merion, Pennsylvania).

Intensely self-critical, Bruce destroyed a great many of his paintings, and only about one hundred works remain. He committed suicide with the drug Veronal in New York City on November 12, 1936.

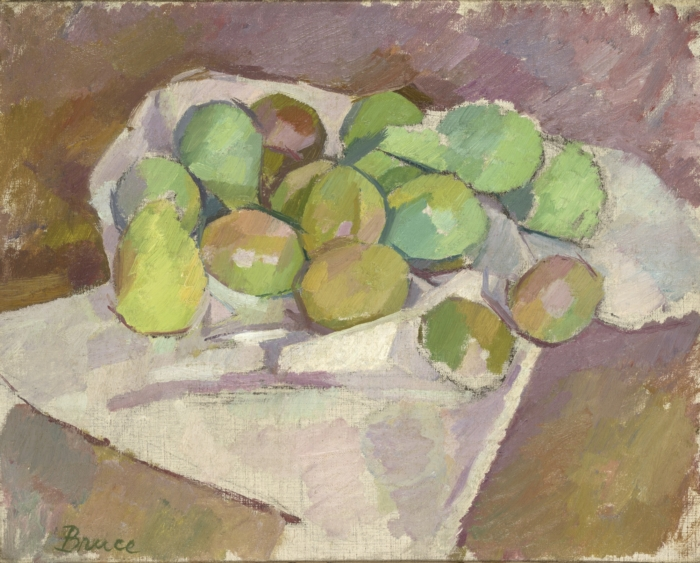
Plums, 1912

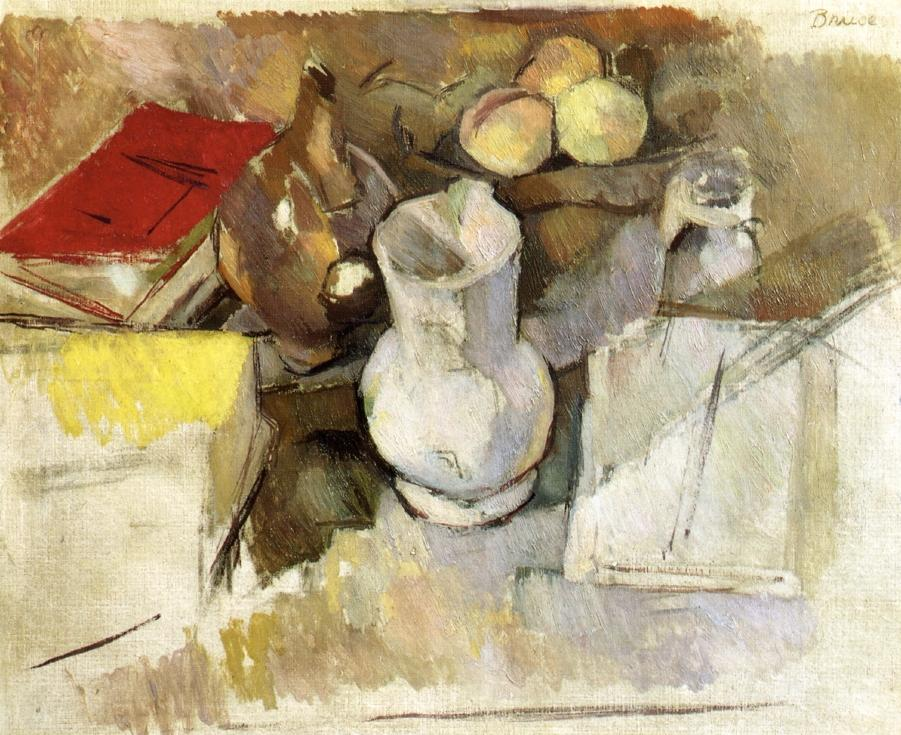
Still Life, ca. 1912

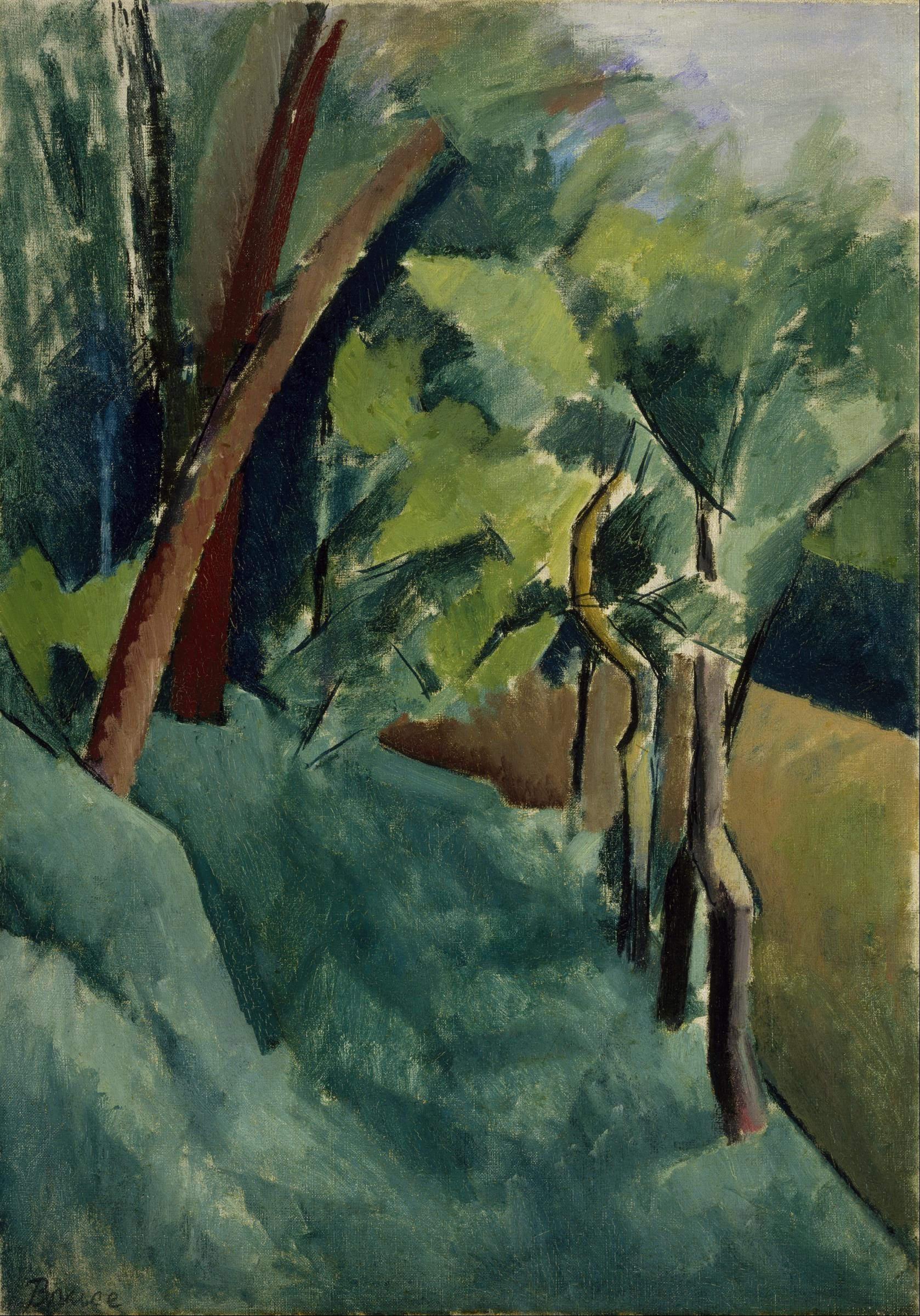
Landscape, c. 1910–1914

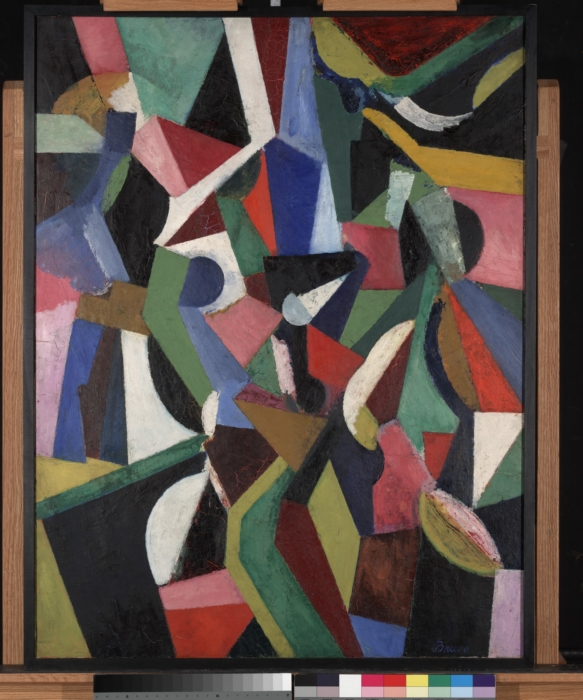
Composition I, 1916

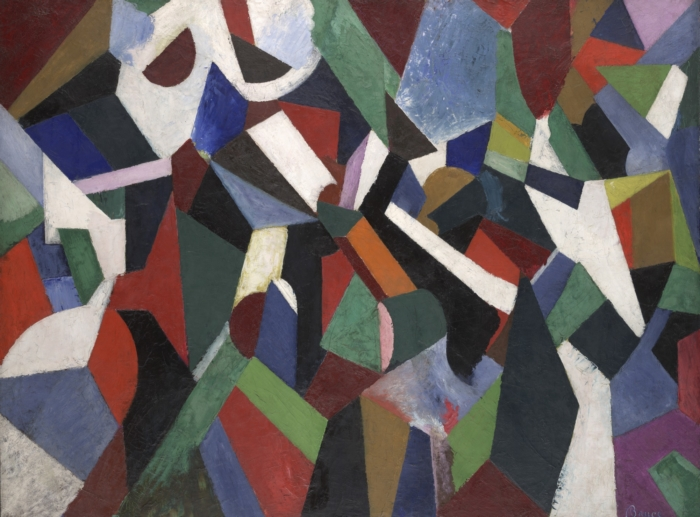
Composition II, c. 1916

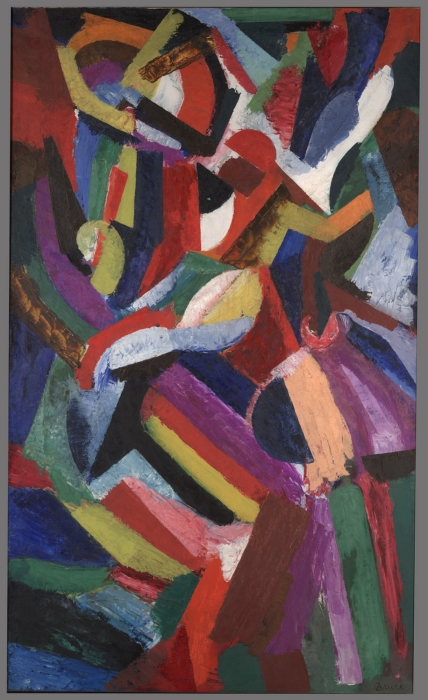
Composition III, 1916

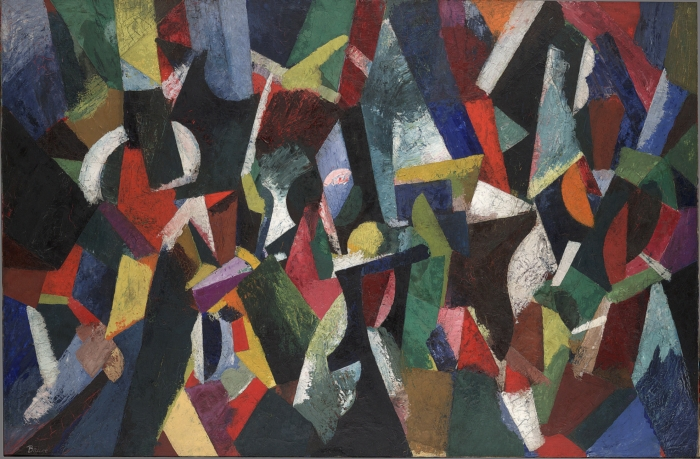
Composition IV, 1916

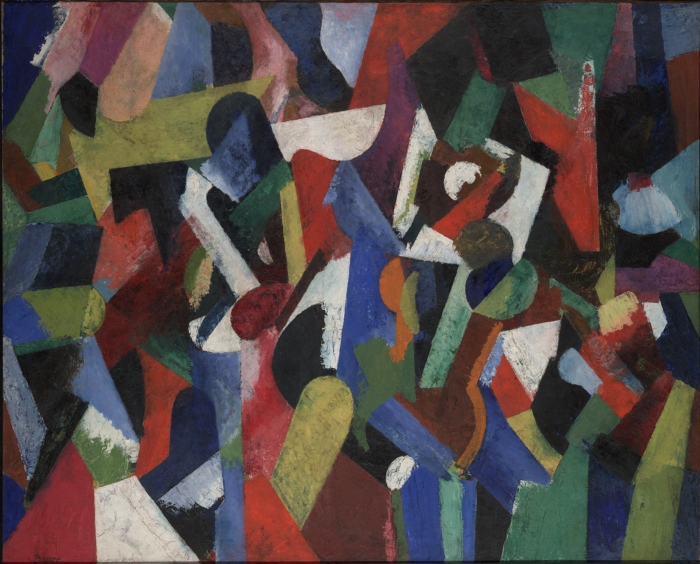
Composition V, 1916

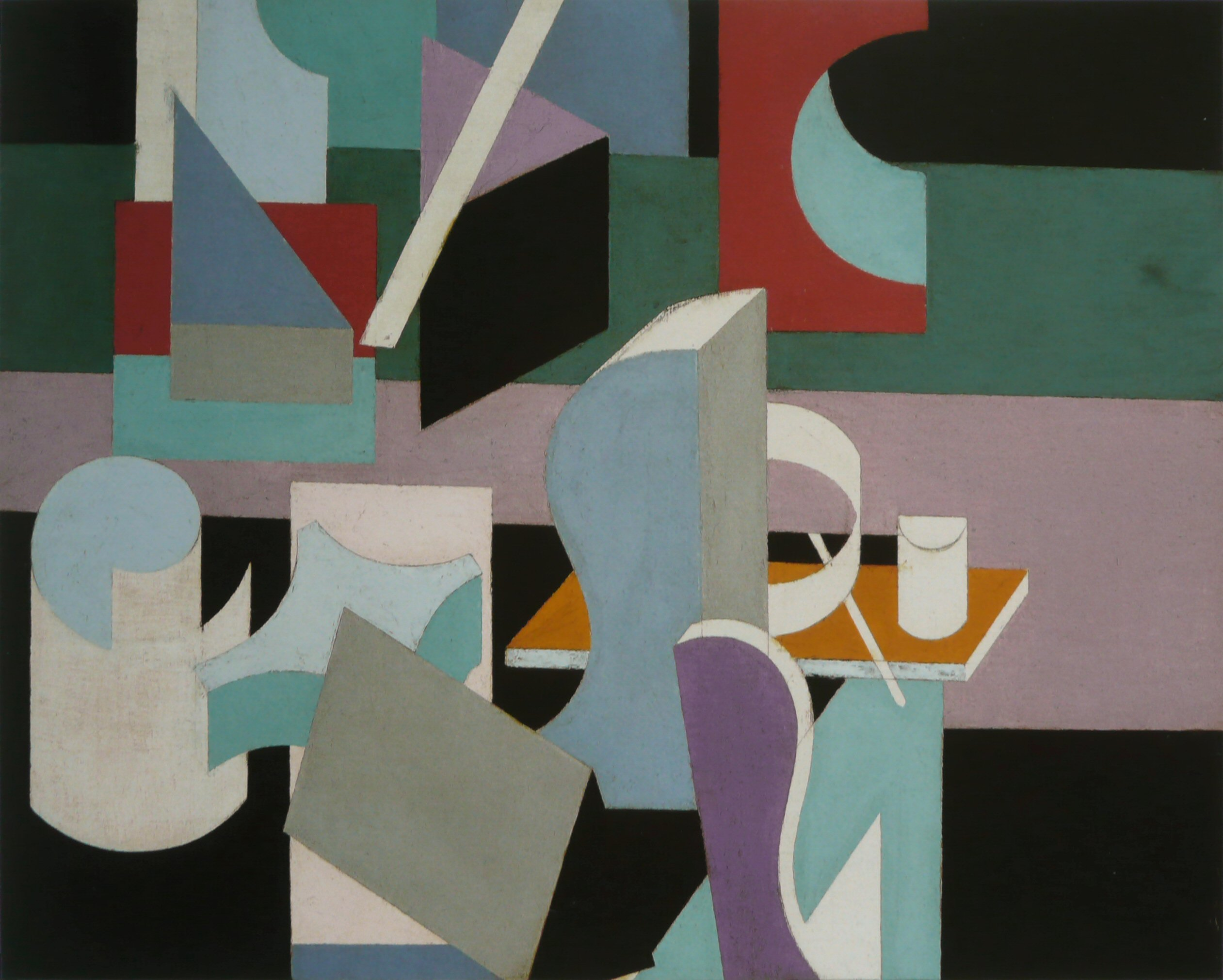
Painting, 1917–1918

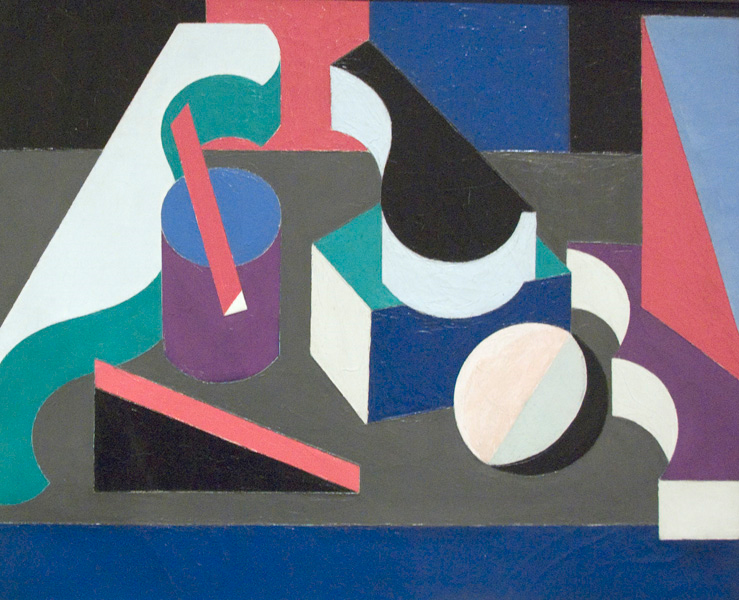
Forms, 1918

== See also ==
- American Modernism
