= Morgan Russell =

American artist

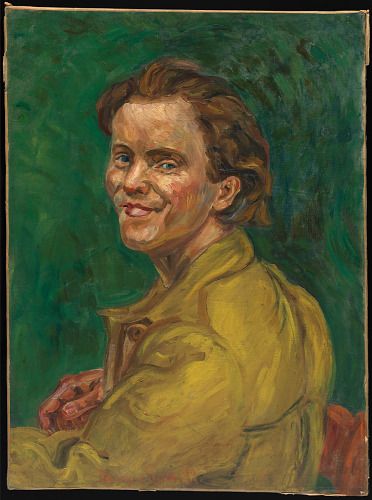
- Self-portrait, c. 1907
- Born: January 25, 1886; New York City
- Died: May 29, 1953 (aged 67)
- Known for: Painting
- Movement: Synchromism

Morgan Russell (January 25, 1886 – May 29, 1953) was a modern American artist. With Stanton Macdonald-Wright, he was the founder of Synchromism, a provocative style of abstract painting that dates from 1912 to the 1920s. Russell's "synchromies," which analogized color to music, were an early American contribution to the rise of Modernism.

== Biography ==
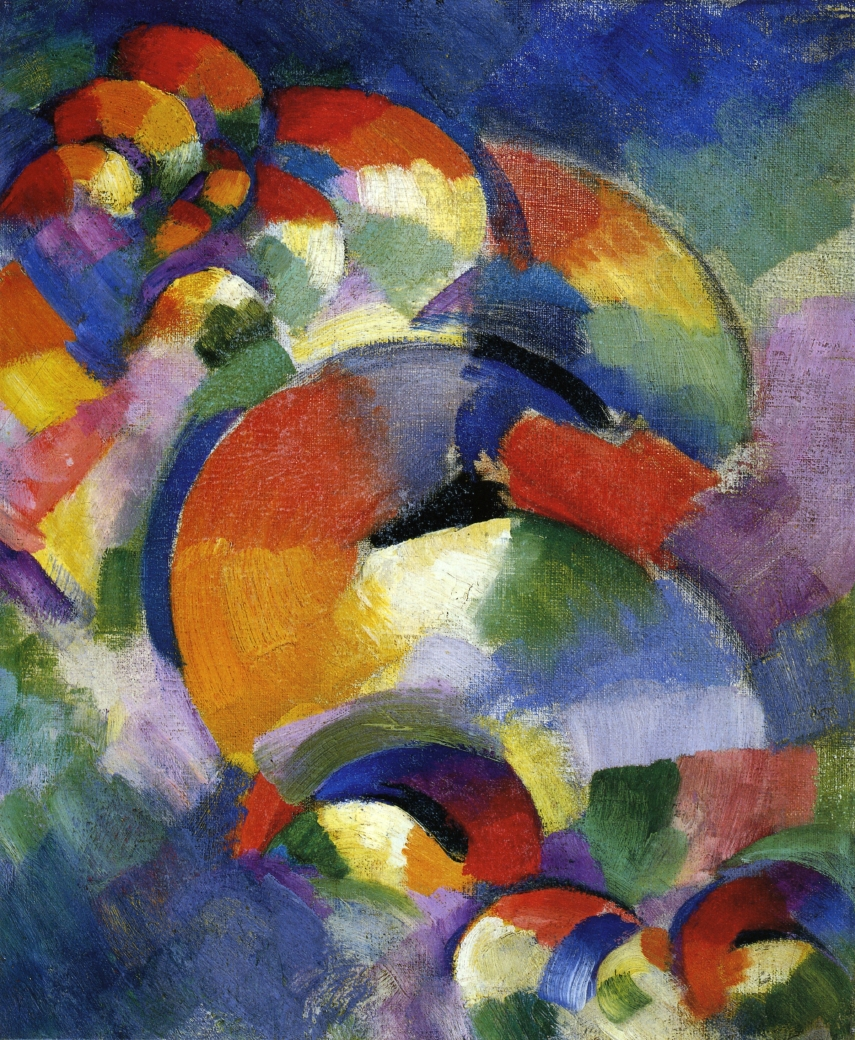
Cosmic Synchromy (1913–14). Oil on canvas, 41.28 cm x 33.34 cm. In the collection of the Munson-Williams-Proctor Arts Institute

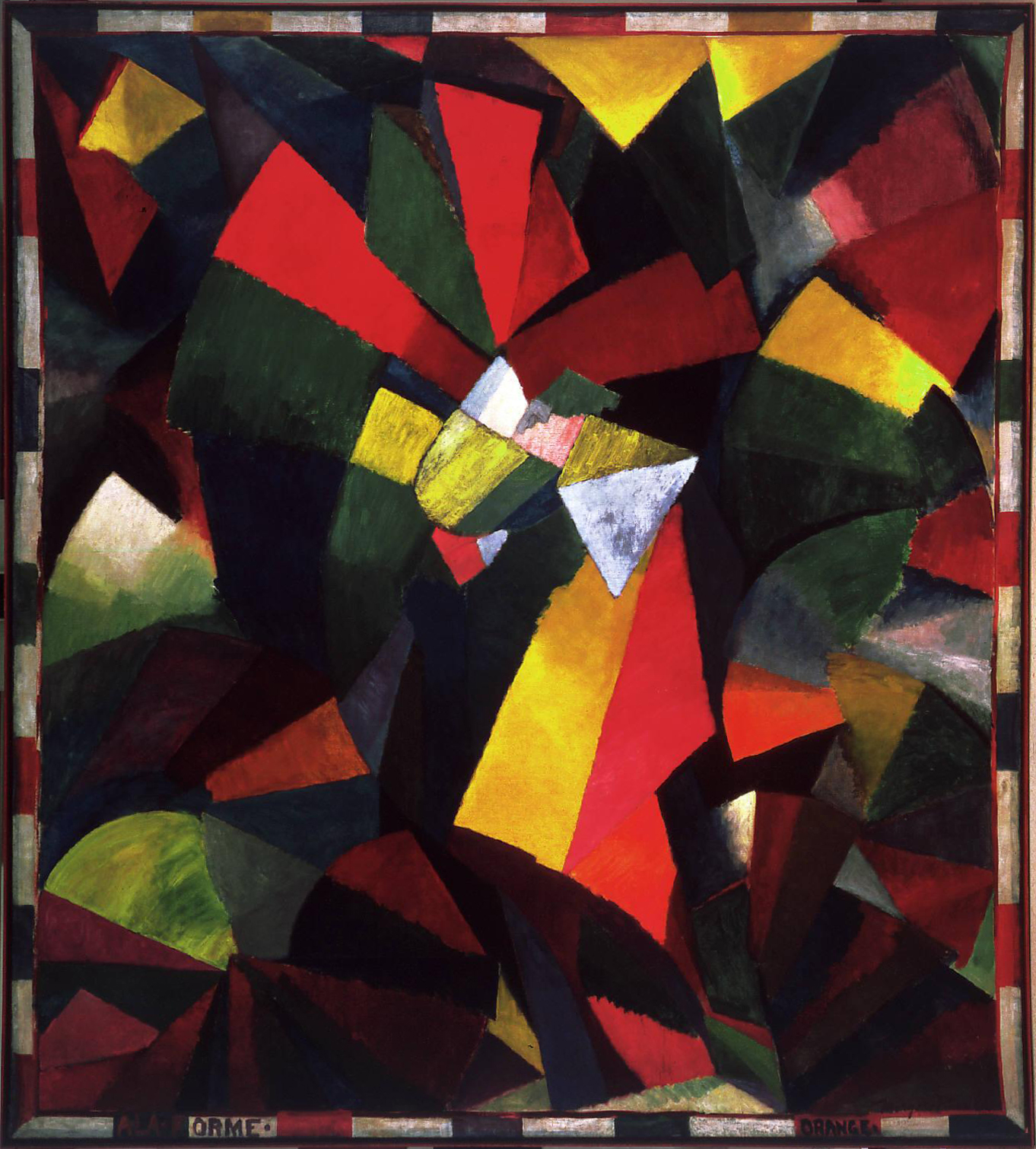
Morgan Russell, 1913–14, Synchromy in Orange, To Form, oil on canvas

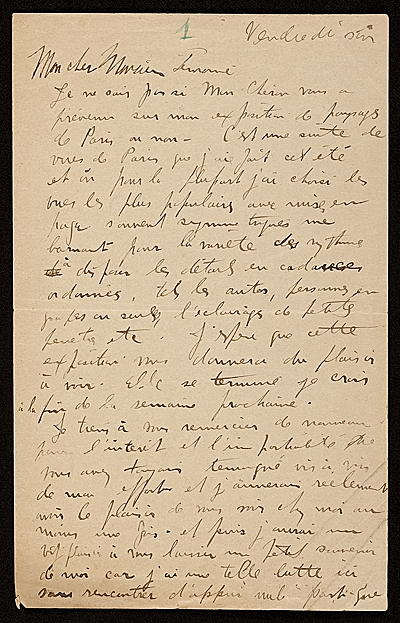
Handwritten letter from Morgan Russell to Jean Gabriel Lemoine, 1923

Russell was born and raised in New York City. He initially studied architecture and, after 1903, became friendly with the sculptor Arthur Lee, for whom he posed as a model and with whom he lived for a time. From 1903 to 1905, he studied sculpture at the Art Students League with Lee and James Earle Fraser; he also posed as a model for the sculpture class. With financial help from Gertrude Vanderbilt Whitney, whom he met at the League in January 1906, he traveled to Europe to study art in Paris and Rome. Mrs. Whitney was one of the earliest and staunchest believers in Russell's talent and provided him with a monthly stipend for several years. In 1907, after returning to New York City, Russell studied painting at the New York School of Art with the noted Ashcan painter Robert Henri, among others. Returning to Paris in 1909, he studied at Matisse’s art school, frequented Gertrude Stein's salon, and met Picasso and Rodin.

In Paris, Russell met Stanton Macdonald-Wright, a fellow expatriate, in 1911, and soon after the two began developing theories about color and its primacy in the creation of a meaningful work of art. Like other young adventurous artists of the time, they had come to view academic realism as a dead-end and were pondering the possibilities of an art form that might minimize or even abandon representational content. They were particularly interested in the theories of their teacher, Canadian painter Percyval Tudor-Hart, who believed that colors could be orchestrated in the same harmonious way that a composer arranges notes in a symphony. Inspired by their experience of Delacroix, the Post-Impressionists, and the Fauves, Russell and Macdonald-Wright co-founded Synchromism in 1912. In June of the same year, they held their first Synchromist exhibition at Der Neue Kunstsalon in Munich, followed four months later by another exhibition at Galerie Bernheim-Jeune in Paris. Like other young modernists eager to make a name for themselves, they issued a manifesto broadcasting their goals, plastered the kiosks of Paris with notices of their show, and hoped to create a sensation. Russell also began exhibiting at the Salon des Indépendants in 1913.

Synchromism was an early innovation in pure abstraction, which was developed primarily by Russell with contributions from Stanton Macdonald-Wright. Other American painters in Paris experimenting with Synchromism at the time included Thomas Hart Benton, Andrew Dasburg, and Patrick Henry Bruce, all of whom were friends with Russell and Macdonald-Wright. Bruce was also friendly with Sonia and Robert Delaunay, proponents of Orphism (a term coined in 1912 by the poet Guillaume Apollinaire). Similarities between Synchromism and Orphism led to later charges of plagiarism, which both Russell and Macdonald-Wright vehemently denied.

Russell and Macdonald-Wright had high hopes for acclaim and financial success when they introduced Synchromism to the New York art world. Though Russell exhibited in the famous Armory Show in New York in 1913 and in the prestigious Forum Exhibition of Modern American Painters in 1916, those hopes were never met. Art collectors, critics, and curators prior to World War I were reluctant to embrace color abstraction and, on the rare occasions when they were open to radical new styles of art, preferred the European modernism attached to names with greater cachet.

The first sympathetic, extended treatment of Synchromism appeared in the book Modern Painting: Its Tendency and Meaning, published in 1915 by Macdonald-Wright's brother, Willard Huntington Wright, a prestigious literary editor and art critic. (Stanton secretly co-authored the book, a fact that the Wright brothers were at pains to conceal.) Modern Painting: Its Tendency and Meaning surveyed the major modern art movements from Manet to Cubism, praised the work of Cézanne and Matisse, denigrated "lesser Moderns" such as Kandinsky and the Orphists, and predicted a coming age in which abstraction would supplant representational art. Synchromism, the subject of a long, adulatory chapter, is presented in the book as the culminating point in the evolutionary process of Modernism. At no time did Wright acknowledge that he was writing about his own brother and his friend, Morgan Russell. Also, by overstating his case, Wright did little long-range good for the cause he was promoting, but his well-reviewed book did bring some informed attention to the two painters. For a time, their names appeared more frequently in the art press, and even H.L. Mencken bought a Synchromist painting, which he later donated to the Baltimore Museum of Art.

By 1920, Russell and Macdonald-Wright had gone their separate ways, though Macdonald-Wright continued to make efforts at selling his friend's work throughout the 1920s. Macdonald-Wright moved back to his native California and established a successful niche for himself as a charismatic figure in the Los Angeles art world. Russell, who was a cross-dresser (though married twice), never ceased painting, either, but he experienced financial difficulties and lapsed into relative obscurity. Synchromism was seldom discussed in art-history textbooks and was not the subject of any major exhibitions before the late 1950s. Gallery exhibitions of Russell's work were infrequent. After spending almost four decades in France between 1909 and 1946, Russell retired to the United States after the war and converted to Catholicism in 1947. His painting in his later years, often of nudes, was largely figurative and displayed none of the color effects he had pioneered with Synchromism. After suffering two incapacitating strokes, he died aged 67 in a nursing home in a suburb of Philadelphia in 1953.

Gradually, during the last three decades of the twentieth century, long-overdue scholarly and public attention was paid to Synchromism. The Whitney Museum of American Art launched a six-museum traveling exhibition in 1978 devoted to color abstraction that brought Russell's name before the public again, and the purchase of his papers by collector Henry Reed, and the subsequent donation to and controversial retrieval of those papers from the Whitney Museum, brought his name into the news. Morgan Russell's first museum retrospective was held at the Montclair Art Museum in New Jersey in 1990. His work is represented today in the collection of the Museum of Modern Art, the Brooklyn Museum, the Walker Art Center in Minneapolis, the Columbus Museum of Art, and the San Diego Museum of Art, among others. His monumental Synchromy in Orange: To Form (1914), in the collection of the Albright-Knox Art Gallery in Buffalo, was one of the centerpieces of the 2013 exhibition at the Museum of Modern Art in New York, "Inventing Abstraction, 1910–1925."

== Sources ==
- Davidson, Abraham A. (1994). Early American Modernist Painting, 1910–1935. New York: DaCapo.
- Hughes, Robert (1994). American Visions: The Epic History of Art in America. New York: Knopf.
- Kushner, Marilyn (1990). Morgan Russell. New York: Hudson Hills.
- Levin, Gail (1978). Synchromism and American Color Abstraction, 1910–1925. New York: George Braziller.
- Loughery, John (1995). Alias S.S. Van Dine. New York: Henry Holt.
- South, Will (2001). Color, Myth, and Music: Stanton Macdonald-Wright and Synchromism. Raleigh, North Carolina: North Carolina Museum of Art.
- Synchromism: Morgan Russell and Stanton Macdonald-Wright. New York: Hollis Taggart Galleries. 1999.
