= Champs de Mars: The Red Tower =

Painting by Robert Delaunay

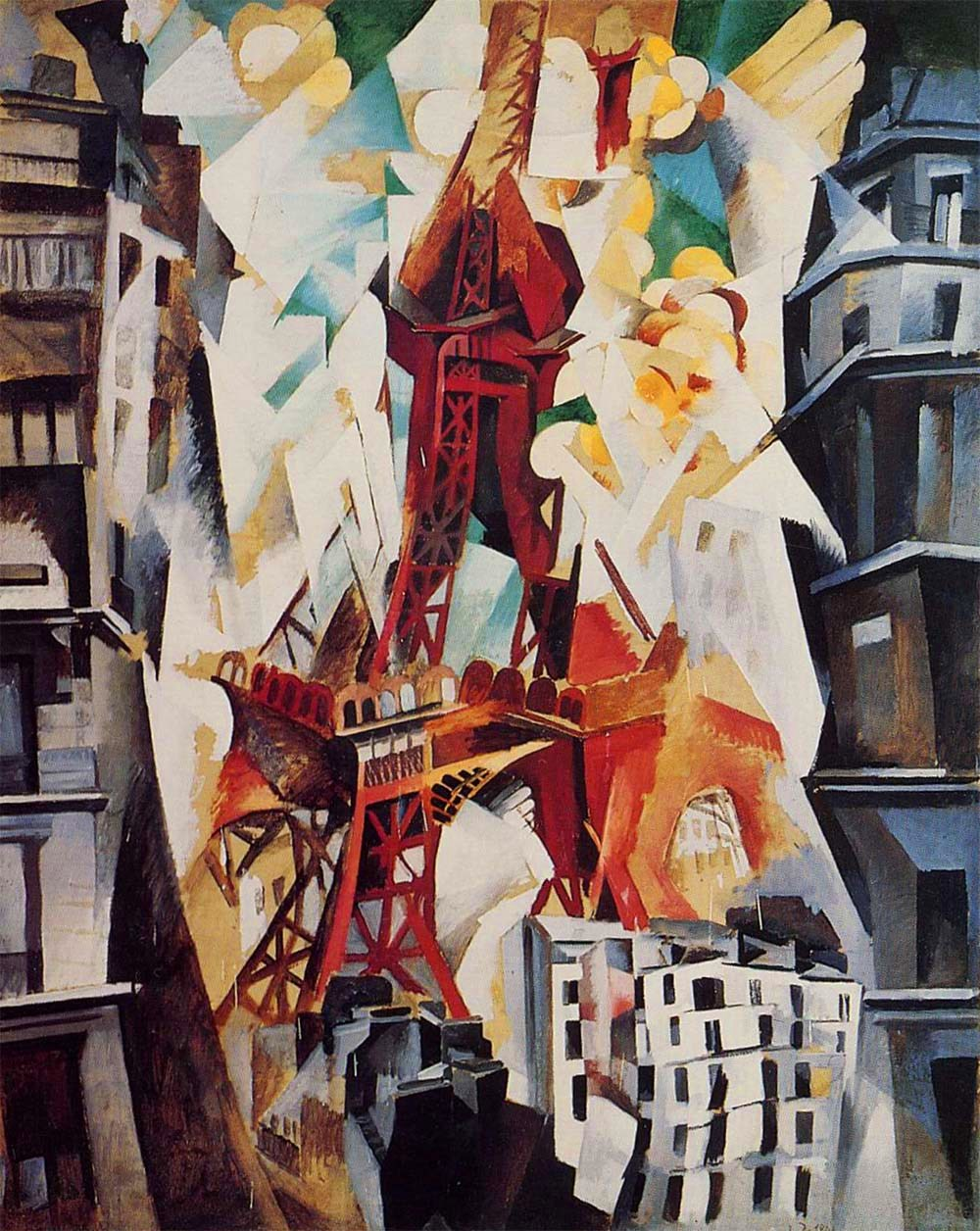
- Artist: Robert Delaunay
- Year: 1911
- Medium: Oil on canvas
- Dimensions: 160.7 cm × 128.6 cm (63.3 in × 50.6 in)
- Location: Art Institute of Chicago, Chicago
- Accession: 1959.1
- Website: Art Institute of Chicago website

Champs de Mars: The Red Tower (French: Champs de Mars: La Tour Rouge) is an oil on canvas painting by the French painter Robert Delaunay, from 1911. It shows an orphic representation of the Eiffel Tower, in Paris. The painting is held in the Art Institute of Chicago.

== History ==
Delaunay's painting style changed quickly in the first decade of the 20th century, keeping pace with the artistic developments of the time. Only few years before of the current painting, he still followed the neo-impressionist style. However, he came under the influence of cubism and the expressionist movement Der Blaue Reiter, with which he exhibited in Munich, in 1911, and his work quickly developed towards his own unique style, orphism, in which defragmentation and surface composition were central, and the figurative would become subordinate to these.

== Description ==
The Eiffel Tower was then the tallest building in the world, and was considered the French symbol par excellence of modernity, especially at the beginning of the 20th century. Delaunay's Champs de Mars: The Red Tower is primarily intended to radiate the power and dynamism of the modernity and innovation at this time. Its red tower rises like a phoenix between the gray Parisian residential blocks. The atmosphere seems deconstructed into a rhythmic swirl of vibrant colors, suggesting a strong sense of movement. The gray cityscape functions as a kind of frame for the subject, like a scene viewed from a balcony or through a window.

== Context ==
The current painting is part of a series with the Eiffel Tower as the subject, which Delaunay made between 1909 and the end of his life. His development as a modernist artist can easily be followed through his 'Tour d'Eiffel' series. While the painting from 1911 still has clear figurative characteristics, he would soon afterwards create a number of works more abstract, where the subject is hardly recognizable. Later in life, Delauney would call this early modernist period as his "destructive" phase. He subjects the area around the tower to a thorough analysis and, in accordance with cubist practice, splits the objects on the canvas into their various contrasting aspects. Elements of impressionism are still be recognized in his Champs de Mars: The Red Tower, especially in the use of light and color, but soon these influences would almost completely disappear.

When Delaunay first exhibited the painting in 1912, he took into account the criticism that the work seemed 'unfinished'. Comparisons of photographs of the work from 1912 with the version when he exhibited for the second time in 1923, show that he updated it intensively, in details but also in composition.
