= Orphism (art) =

Art movement, an offshoot of cubism

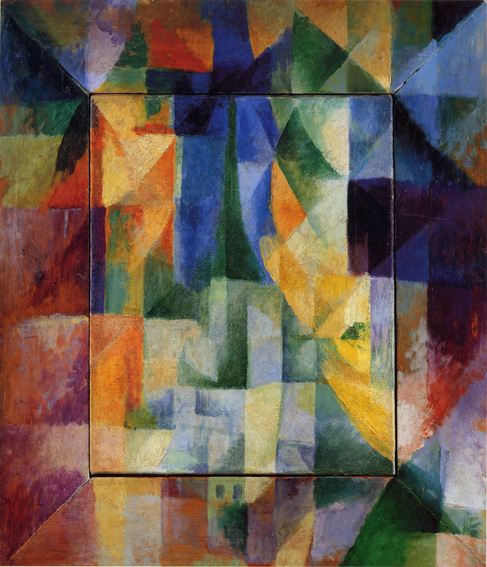
Robert Delaunay (1912) Simultaneous Windows on the City Kunsthalle Hamburg

Orphism or Orphic Cubism is a school of visual art which was an offshoot of Cubism and focused on pure abstraction and bright colors. The term was coined by the French poet Guillaume Apollinaire in 1912. Orphism was influenced by Fauvism, the theoretical writings of Paul Signac, Charles Henry and the dye chemist Michel Eugène Chevreul. This movement, perceived as key in the transition from Cubism to Abstract art, was pioneered by František Kupka, Robert Delaunay and Sonia Delaunay, who relaunched the use of color during the monochromatic phase of Cubism.

Orphism art scrutinizes color and the effects of light. Orphism art was painted in the early 1910s, when modern technology innovations altered the perceived time and space. Artists who engaged with Orphism explored the transformative possibilities of color, form, and motion. Artists whose work have been classified in, or influenced by, this style include Marcel Duchamp, Mainie Jellett, Francis Picabia, Amadeo de Souza-Cardoso, Stanton Macdonald-Wright, and Morgan Russell.

== History ==
František Kupka (1912-1913) Katedrála (The Cathedral) oil on canvas, 180 x 150 cm, Museum Kampa, Prague, Czech Republic

The Orphists were rooted in Cubism but tended towards a pure lyrical abstraction. They saw art as the unification of sensation and color. More concerned with sensation, they began with recognizable subjects, depicted with abstract structures. Orphism aimed to vacate recognizable subject matter by concentrating exclusively on form and color. The movement also strove toward the ideals of Simultanism: endless interrelated states of being.

The decomposition of spectral light in Neo-Impressionist color theory of Paul Signac and Charles Henry played an important role in the development of Orphism. Robert Delaunay, Albert Gleizes, and Gino Severini all knew Henry personally. A mathematician, inventor, and esthetician, Charles Henry was a close friend of the Symbolist writers Félix Fénéon and Gustave Kahn. He also knew Seurat, Signac and Pissarro, whom he met during the eighth and last Impressionist exhibition in 1886. Henry brought emotional associational theory into the realm of art: something that ultimately influenced the Neo-Impressionists. Henry and Seurat agreed that the basic elements of art—line, color and form—like words, could be treated independently, each with its own abstract quantity, independent of one another, or in unison, depending on the intention of the artist. "Seurat knows well" wrote Fénéton in 1889, "that the line, independent of its topographical role, possesses an assessable abstract value" in addition to the particles of color, and the relation to emotion of the viewer. The underlying theory behind Neo-Impressionsim had a lasting effect on the works of Delaunay. The Neo-Impressionists had succeeded in establishing an objective scientific basis for their painting in the domain of color, but only as regards the spectrum of light (for paint pigments the result was less scientific). The Cubists ultimately employed the theory to some extent in color, form and dynamics.

== Apollinaire ==
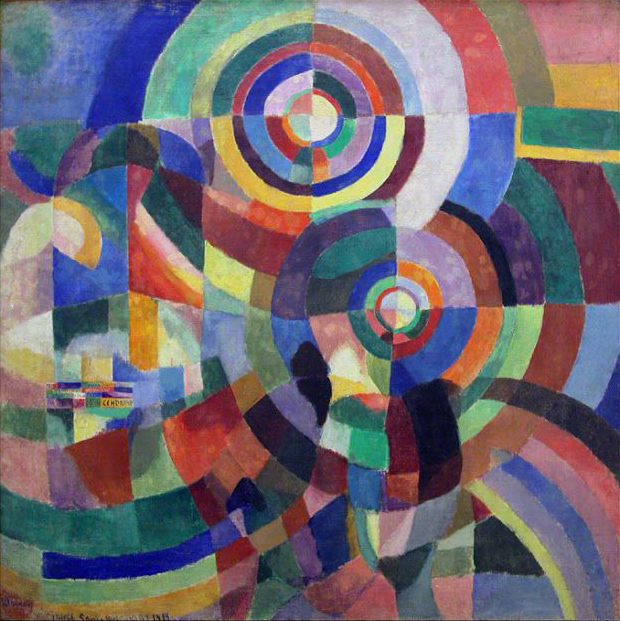
Sonia Delaunay (1914) Prismes électriques, oil on canvas, 250 x 250 cm, Musée National d'Art Moderne, Centre Pompidou Paris

Apollinaire mentioned the term Orphism in an address at the Salon de la Section d'Or in 1912, referring to the pure painting of František Kupka.

In his 1913 Les Peintres Cubistes, Méditations Esthétiques Apollinaire described Orphism as "the art of painting new totalities with elements that the artist does not take from visual reality, but creates entirely by himself." Apollinaire contended that the work of an Orphic painter "should convey an 'untroubled aesthetic pleasure', a meaningful structure and sublime significance."

These analogies could be seen in the works of František Kupka and Wassily Kandinsky. Both artists attempted to synthesis the scientific in visual and aural realms, and thereby elevated the possibilities with abstraction. Robert Delaunay and Sonia Delaunay painted electric light and believed that light could emit from a painting.

== Exhibitions ==
The Salon de la Section d'Or in 1912 was the first exhibition that presented Orphism to the general public. In March 1913 Orphism was exhibited at the Salon des Indépendants in Paris. Reviewing the salon in Montjoie (29 March 1913) Apollinaire argued for the abolition of Cubism in favor of Orphism: "If Cubism is dead, long live Cubism. The kingdom of Orpheus is at hand!"

The Autumn salon (Erster Deutscher Herbstsalon, Berlin) of 1913, organized by Herwarth Walden of Der Sturm, exhibited many works by Robert and Sonia Delaunay, Jean Metzinger's L'Oiseau bleu (1913, Musée d'Art Moderne de la Ville de Paris), Albert Gleizes' Les Joueurs de football (1912-1913, National Gallery of Art), paintings by Picabia, and Léger, along with several Futurist works. From this exhibition Apollinaire's relation with R. Delaunay cooled, following remarks with Umberto Boccioni about the ambiguity of 'simultaneity'. Apollinaire no longer used the term Orphism in his subsequent writings and began instead promoting Picabia, Alexander Archipenko, and Futurist concepts.

== The Delaunays ==
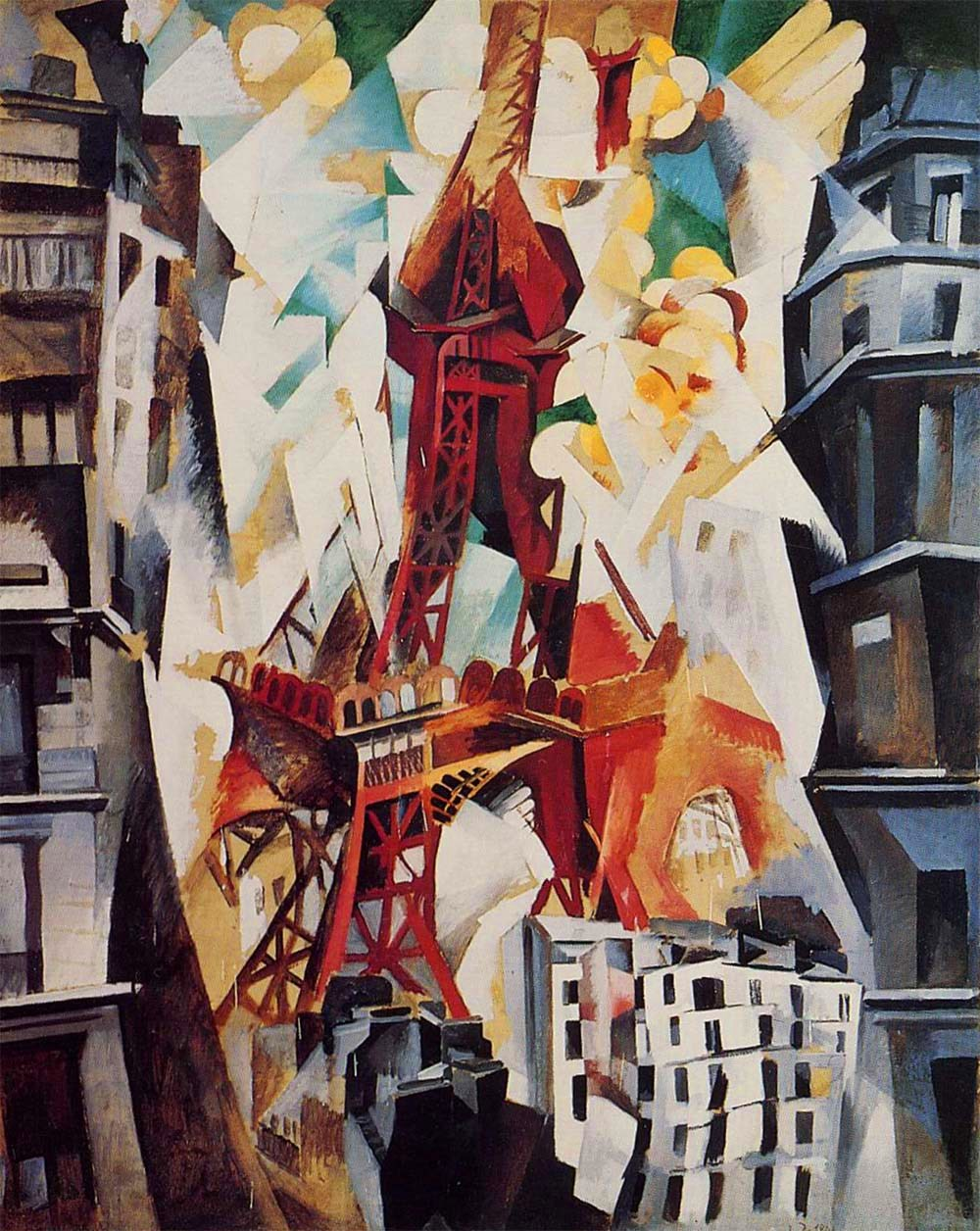
Robert Delaunay (1911) Champs de Mars: The Red Tower Art Institute of Chicago

Robert Delaunay and his wife Sonia Terk Delaunay remained the main protagonists of the Orphic movement. Their earlier works focused on Fauvist colors, variously abstract; such as Sonia's 1907 Finnish Girl and Robert's 1906 Paysage au disque, the former relying on pure colors, the latter on color and mosaic-like brushstrokes painted under the influence of Jean Metzinger, also a Neo-Impressionist (with highly Divisionist and Fauve components) at the time.

Delaunay officially broke with cubism in 1912, faulting Picasso for restricting the palette of his still lifes to muted, monkish tones of brown and gray, and for retaining traces of figurative imagery.

Even though Orphism was effectively dissolved before World War I, American painters Patrick Henry Bruce and Arthur Burdett Frost Jr., two of R. Delaunay's pupils, embarked on a similar form of art from 1912 onward. The Synchromists Morgan Russell and Stanton Macdonald-Wright wrote their own manifestos in an attempt to differentiate themselves from the Orphism of the Delaunays.

== See also ==
- Purism
- De Stijl
- Crystal Cubism
- Orpheus (play)

== References and sources ==
Sources

- Baron, Stanley; Damase, Jacques. Sonia Delaunay: The Life of an Artist. Harry N. Abrams, Inc., 1995
- Buckberrough, Sherry A. Robert Delaunay: The Discovery of Simultaneity. Ann Arbor, Michigan: UMI Research Press, 1978.
- Chadwick, Whitney; de Courtivron, Isabelle. (ed) Significant Others: Creativity and Intimate partnership. London: Thames & Hudson, 1993.
- Chip, Herschel B. "Orphism and Color Theory". The Art Bulletin, Vol. 40, No. 1, pp. 55–63, Mar 1958.
- Damase, Jacque. Sonia Delaunay: Rhythms and Colours. Greenwich, Connecticut: New York Graphic Society Ltd, 1972.
- Gale, Matthew. Dada and Surrealism. New York: Phaidon Press Inc., 2006
- Hughes, Gordon "Envisioning Abstraction: The Simultaneity of Robert Delaunay's First Disk". The Art Bulletin, Vol. 89, No. 2, pp. 306–332, Jun 2007. The College Art Association.
- MoMA. Orphism
- Seidner, David. Sonia Delaunay. BOMB Magazine, 2/Winter, ART, 1982. BOMB Magazine: Sonia Delauney by David Seidner
- Stangoes, Nikos (ed). Concepts of Modern Art: Fauvism to Post-Modernism. Chapter: "Orphism", Virginia Spate. (Revised) London: Thames & Hudson, 1981.
