= Percyval Tudor-Hart =

Canadian painter (1873–1954)

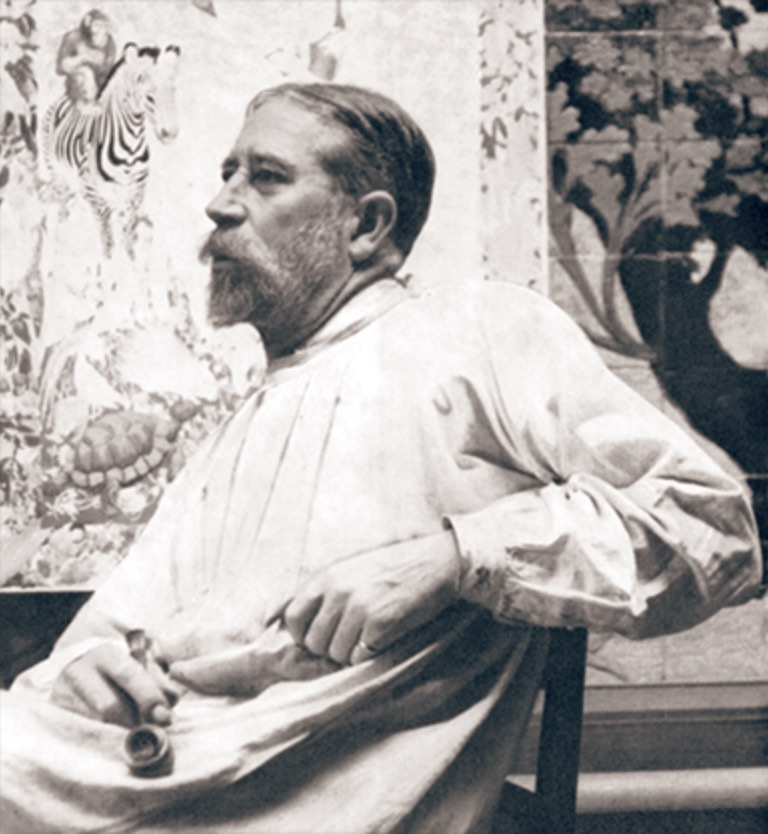
- Tudor-Hart in 1934
- Born: Ernest Percyval Tudor-Hart; 27 December 1873; Montreal, Quebec, Canada
- Died: 8 June 1954 (aged 80); Quebec City, Quebec, Canada
- Education: Académie Julian, Paris; École des Beaux-Arts, Paris (1894)
- Known for: Painter, sculptor, teacher, restorer of paintings
- Spouse(s): Nellie Kleczkowska (1866-1917); Nancy Anne Richards (1881-1931); Catherine Rhodes (1888-1972, m. 1935)
- Awards: Silver Medal and Gold Medal, both from the City of Paris, France

Percyval Tudor-Hart (27 December 1873 – June 08, 1954) was a Canadian painter, sculptor, teacher and restorer of paintings.

== Career ==
Percyval Tudor-Hart was born in Montreal, Canada. He studied in Paris at the Académie Julian and then at the École des Beaux-Arts, Paris in 1894 with Gérôme whom he admired. He exhibited his work beginning in 1896 at the Salon and Salon de la Société des Artistes Français and won Gold and Silver medals at the Salon. He was friendly with Henri Matisse and shared a studio in Montmartre with Toulouse-Lautrec. But his paintings, unlike theirs, reveal a sensitivity to French Impressionism.

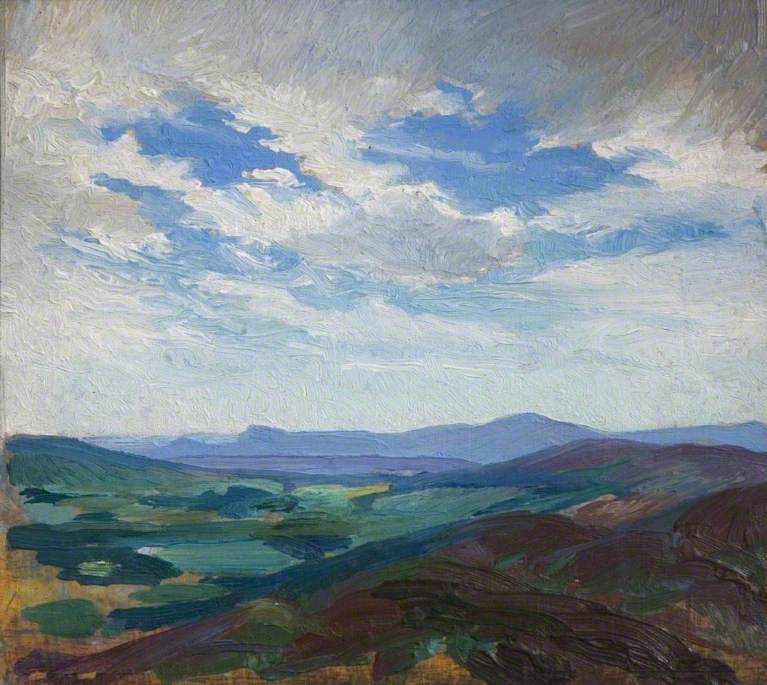
Percyval Tudor-Hart (1873–1954) Evening in Huntingdonshire - Birmingham Museums Trust

He also was known as a teacher in Paris having established "Tudor-Hart's Académie de Peinture" at 69 Rue d'Assas (1903). In 1913, he moved the school to Meudon, a suburb of Paris, and then after his first wife died in 1917 to London, England and taught there, but that year, due to World War I, he began to work in the war effort as an early exponent of camouflage. Besides designing for tanks and boats, he fabricated sniper's gloves.

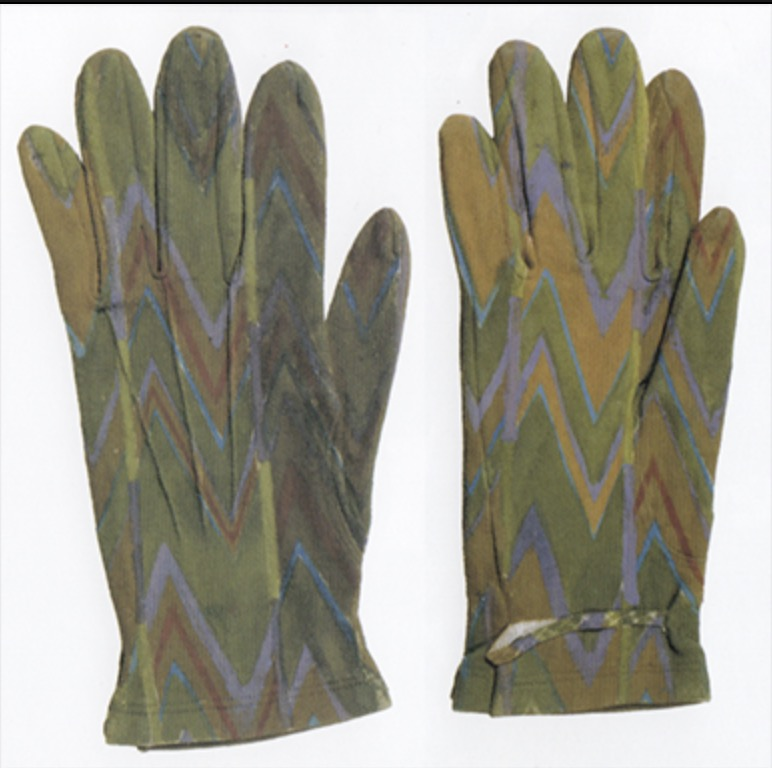
Tudor-Hart's camouflaged sniper's gloves

After World War I, he exhibited work at the Royal Academy in London and the Walker Art Gallery in Liverpool.

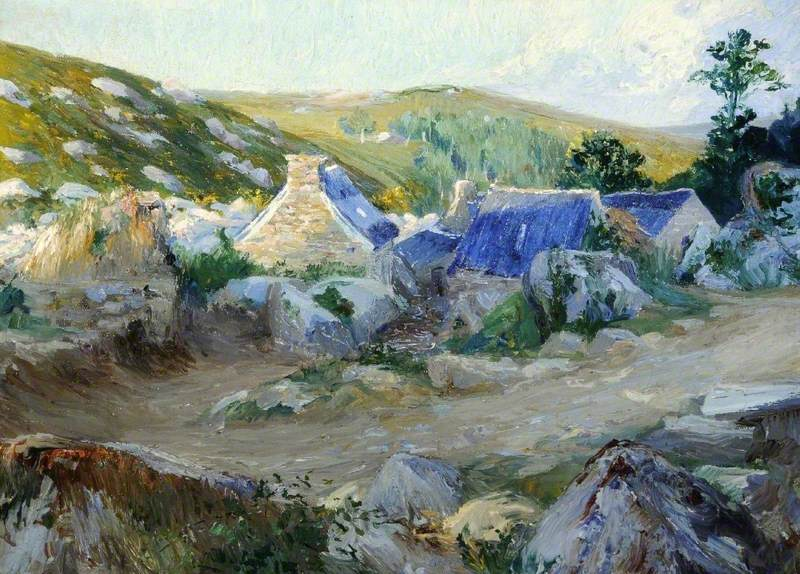
Percyval Tudor-Hart (1873–1954) Farm Buildings at Kervao, France - Ferens Art Gallery

Students, such as R A Wilson, in his "Memoirs of an Individualist" recorded Tudor-Hart rigorous teaching methods. Other students, including Morgan Russell who studied with Tudor-Hart in 1911, recorded Tudor-Hart's colour theory and his mathematical analogies between colour and tone. He also designed for a short time for Lalique, made designs for folding fans and restored paintings, some major such as a Gainsborough and others. He served as a consultant for the preservation of Old Master paintings. From 1923 to 1928, he was a member of the Royal Academy Committee on the Treatment of Old Pictures. He also studied painting techniques and especially tempera. As a member of the Tempera Society, Tudor-Hart wrote the forward to the "Practical Tempera Painting: A Student's Cennini" (1941). He also was a member of the Art Workers' Guild.

His third marriage in 1935 was to Catherine Rhodes, a painter whose family owned the Cataraqui Estate, near Quebec City.

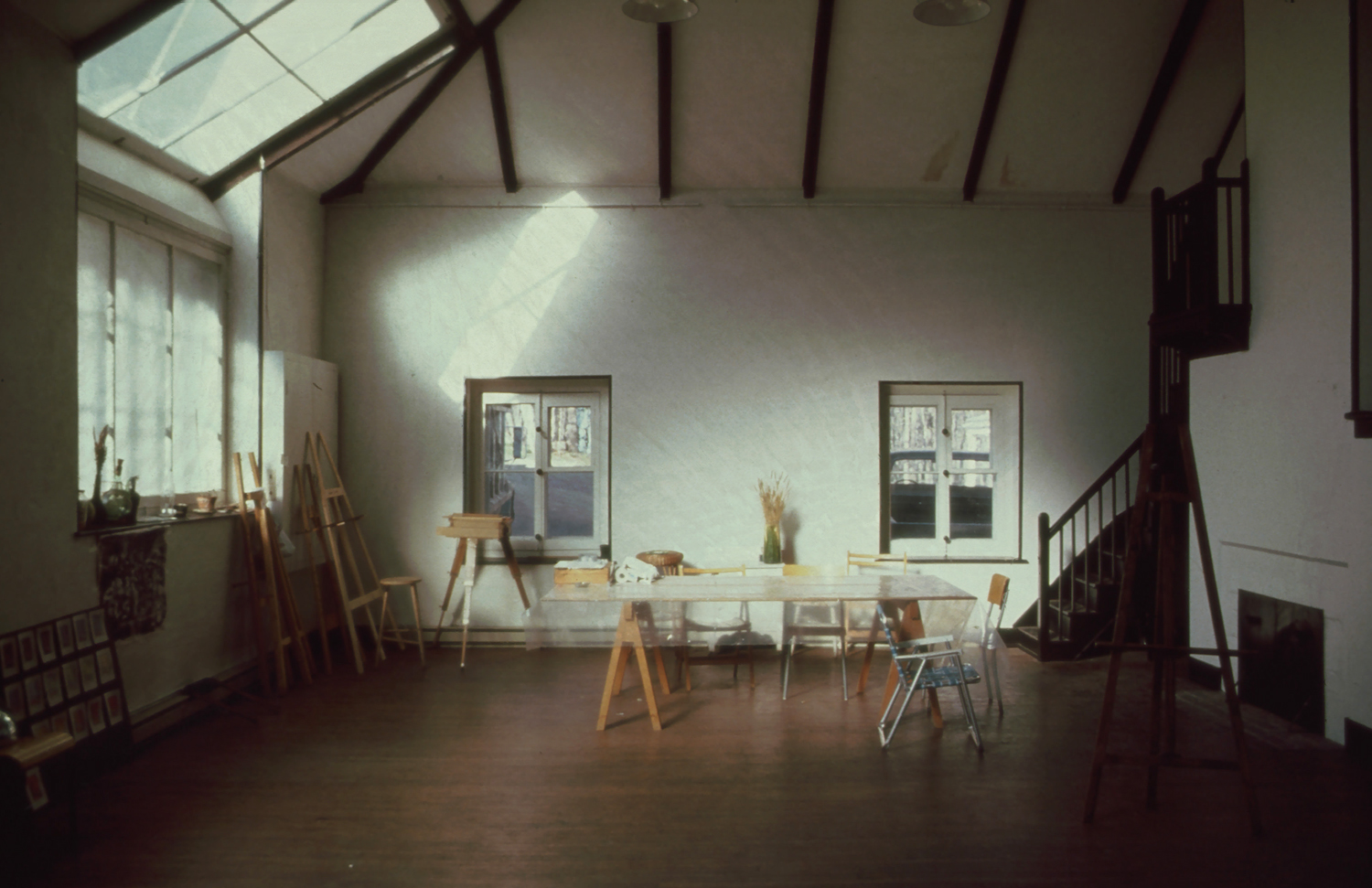
Domaine Cataraqui, 2141 chemin Saint-Louis, Québec vue intérieure de l'atelier du peintre Ernest Percyval Tudor-Hart 11-d.na.civile-81-750

After his marriage, he returned to Canada and lived with his wife in her villa located at 2141 Saint-Louis Road, which was designated a historical monument in 1975 and today has been restored, especially the workshop, house and historic gardens, by the National Capital Commission of Quebec.

He died in Quebec City in 1954. The Rhodes and Tudor Hart Family Fonds is in the McGill University Library Archives Collections.

In 1943, the Musée de la Province de Québec (today the Musée national des beaux-arts du Québec) held a retrospective exhibition of his work which was favorably reviewed. In 1961, the Percival Tudor-Hart Memorial Exhibition was held at Walker's Galleries, London, England and in 1964, Percyval Tudor-Hart was held at the Montreal Museum of Fine Arts, Montreal, QC. In 2019, the National Gallery of Canada's travelling show, Canada and Impressionism: New Horizons, 1880-1930 included Tudor-Hart's work.

== Selected public collections ==
His works are well represented in UK public collections, including the Aberdeen Art Gallery & Museums, Ashmolean Museum, Birmingham Museums Trust, Ferens Art Gallery, Fitzwilliam Museum, Victoria & Albert Museum, and Walker Art Gallery. The Imperial War Museum also holds objects based on Tudor-Hart's camouflage designs.

In France, his work is in the Musée d'Orsay and Pompidou Centre.

In Canada, his work is in the National Gallery of Canada, Art Gallery of Greater Victoria, Musée national des beaux-arts du Québec, Montreal Museum of Fine Arts, Robert McLaughlin Gallery, Oshawa and Royal Ontario Museum, Toronto.
