= Arthur Lee (sculptor) =

American sculptor (1881–1961)

Pony Express Mail Carrier, 1860–1861, Lee's sculpture at the William Jefferson Clinton Federal Building in Washington, D.C., was commissioned by the Section of Painting and Sculpture in 1937.

Arthur Lee (May 4, 1881 – 1961) was a Norwegian-born American sculptor, and educator.

== Life and career ==
Arthur Lee was born in Trondheim, Norway. His family immigrated to the United States in 1888, settling in St. Paul, Minnesota. He studied at the Art Students League of New York in New York City, before returning to Europe to study the École des Beaux-Arts in Paris, as well as in Rome and London.

He was one of the more conservative artists who exhibited at the Armory Show in 1913 where he displayed eight drawings and sculptures and was one of a dozen sculptors invited to compete in the Pioneer Woman statue competition in 1927. He also taught at the Art Students League of New York; among his pupils was Eleanor Platt.

Lee was a member of the National Sculpture Society and the National Academy of Design. He died in May 1961.
