= Cardiff Team =

Painting by Robert Delaunay

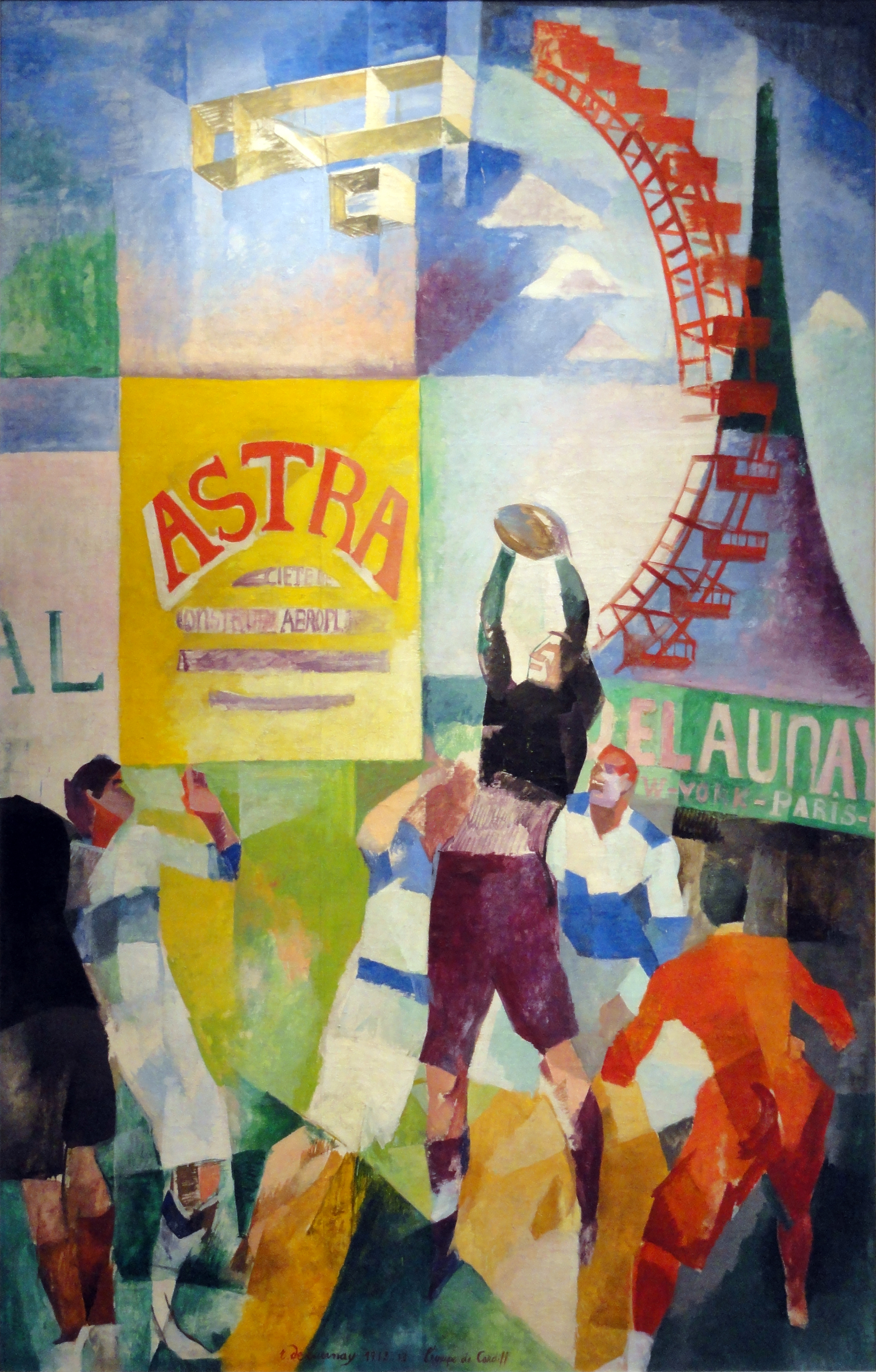
- Artist: Robert Delaunay
- Year: 1913
- Medium: oil on canvas
- Dimensions: 326 cm × 208 cm (128 in × 82 in)
- Location: Musée d'Art Moderne de Paris, Paris

The Cardiff Team (French: L'Équipe de Cardiff) is an oil on canvas painting by French painter Robert Delaunay, created in 1913. It was the second in a series of paintings on the same subject produced between 1912 and 1913, and presented at the Salon des Indépendants, in 1913. The current painting is held at the Musée d'Art Moderne de Paris.

== History and description ==
Robert Delaunay was very involved in the artistic movements of the beginning of the 20th century. After going through neoimpressionism and divisionism, he created simultanism, with his wife, Sonia Delaunay, a technique which aimed to create pictorial harmony through the simultaneous arrangement of colors. Like his friends Guillaume Apollinaire and Blaise Cendrars, Delaunay was fascinated by modernity, whether by the exploits of aviators, like he shows in his Homage to Blériot, or in here by the sport of rugby, then in full expansion and already very popular in France and the British Isles. Delaunay took inspiration of a photograph that he saw in a magazine of a rugby game for the painting series of which this was the second made.

The painting depicts a game where a rugby team from Cardiff, in Wales, is participating, facing an unnamed adversary, possibly a French team. Six rugby players are shown in the lower part of the work, in sporting attires and in action, with their brightly colored jerseys made of crude lines. Three players have the same white and blue stripped jerseys, while the other three sportsmen belong to the opposite team. One of them is seen jumping while catching the ball. On the upper level of the painting there is an advertising poster with the slogan “Astra” and behind it some of the great inventions and creations of the time: a biplane, a rollercoaster and the Eiffel Tower. The name Delaunay can be seen at the bottom of the tower in a sort of advertisement, with the names of the cities of New York and Paris below.

== Analysis ==
During the same period, Delaunay painted Windows, a series which is closer to abstract art. But, in the series dedicated to the Cardiff Team, the painting cannot be considered abstract, because there are many elements of everyday life visible: the rugby players, an advertising board, the Eiffel Tower, a rollercoaster. This series is, however, according to Pascal Rousseau, a vibrant manifesto of simultanism, much more than the Windows series.
