= Rhythms (Delaunay) =

1934 painting by Robert Delaunay

- Rythmes (French)
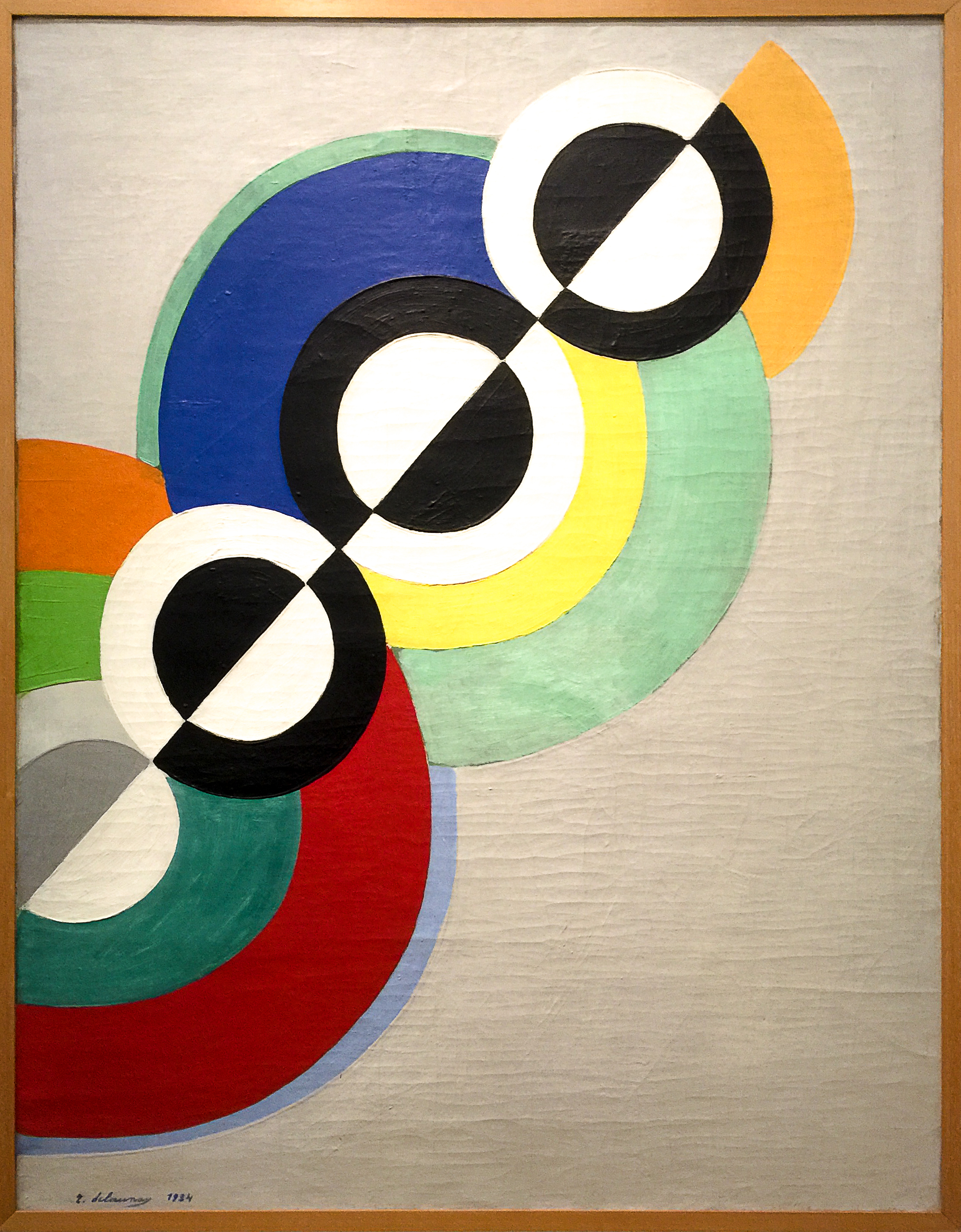
- Artist: Robert Delaunay
- Year: 1934
- Medium: Oil on canvas
- Dimensions: 145 cm × 113 cm (57 in × 44 in)
- Location: Musée National d'Art Moderne, Paris
- Accession: AM 4085 P
- Website: www.centrepompidou.fr/en/ressources/oeuvre/TFSkWsg

Rhythms (French: Rythmes) is an oil on canvas painting by the French artist Robert Delaunay, from 1934. It is part of the collection of the Musée National d'Art Moderne, in Paris.

The painting was inspired by the round shapes that marked the return of the artist to orphism and study of harmony in painting.
