= Windows Open Simultaneously 1st Part, 3rd Motif =

Painting by Robert Delaunay

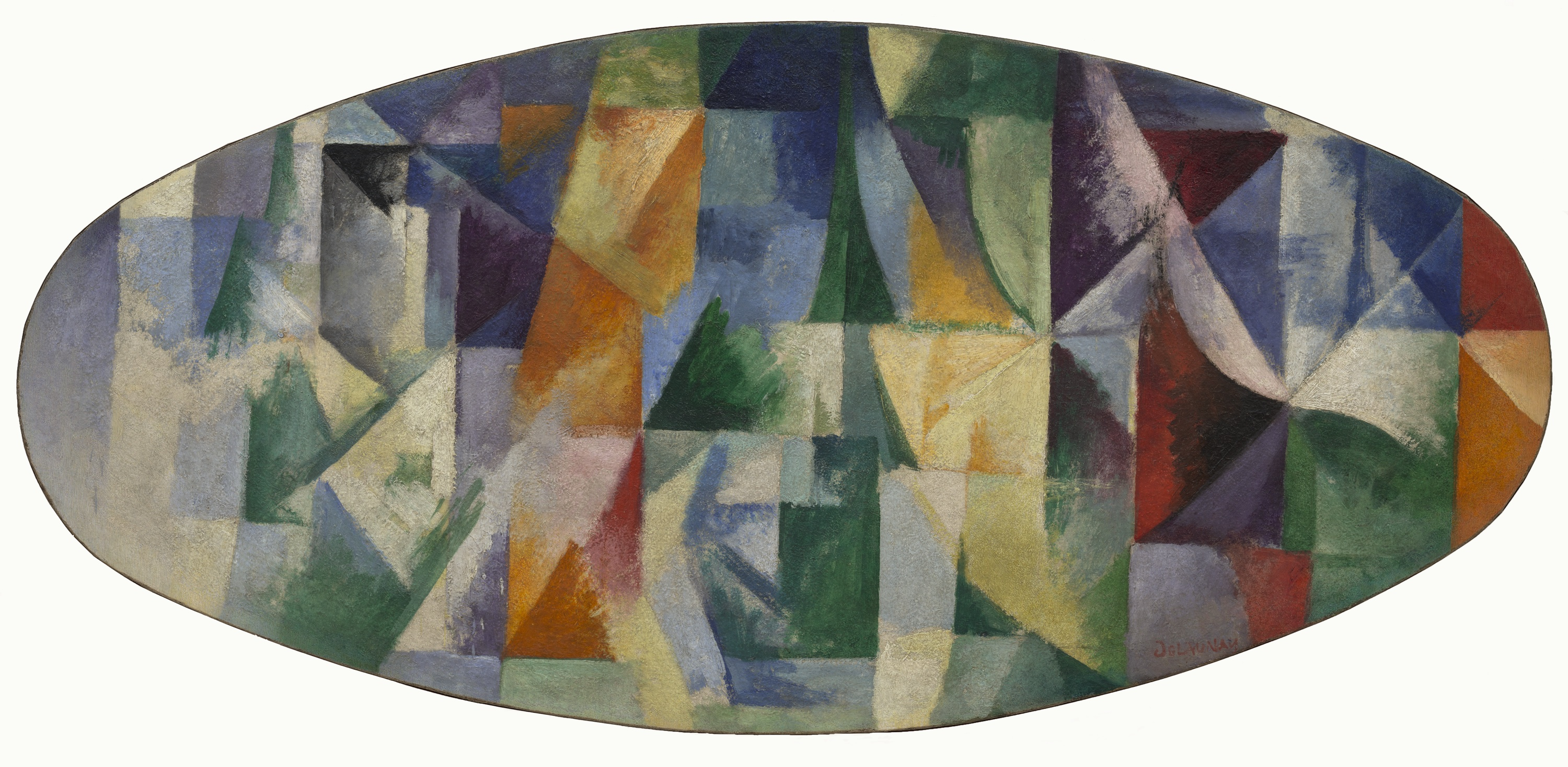
- Artist: Robert Delaunay
- Year: 1912
- Medium: oil on canvas
- Dimensions: 57 cm × 123 cm (22 in × 48 in)
- Location: Solomon R. Guggenheim Museum, New York
- Accession: 76.2553.36
- Website: www.guggenheim.org/artwork/1024

Windows Open Simultaneously 1st Part, 3rd Motif (French: Fenêtres ouvertes simultanément Ière partie 3e motif) is an oil-on-canvas painting by French painter Robert Delaunay, created in 1912. It is part of the Windows painting series. The current painting, like its predecessor, Simultaneous Windows 2nd Motif, 1st Part, is held at the Solomon R. Guggenheim Museum, in New York. A painting with the same title is held at Tate Modern, in London.

== History and description ==
Delaunay when he created this painting series had already left representation. However, some references are still visible here, like the almost undetectable presence of the Eiffel Tower, in the green colour, at the center. The artist had been inspired by analytic cubism in his geometric forms, but this orphic composition is defined by the usage or diaphanous and prismatic colours.

Delaunay explained in 1913: “Line is limitation. Color gives depth—not perspectival, not successive, but simultaneous depth—as well as form and movement.”

== See also ==
- Windows (Delaunay series)
