= Windows (Delaunay series) =

Painting series by Robert Delaunay

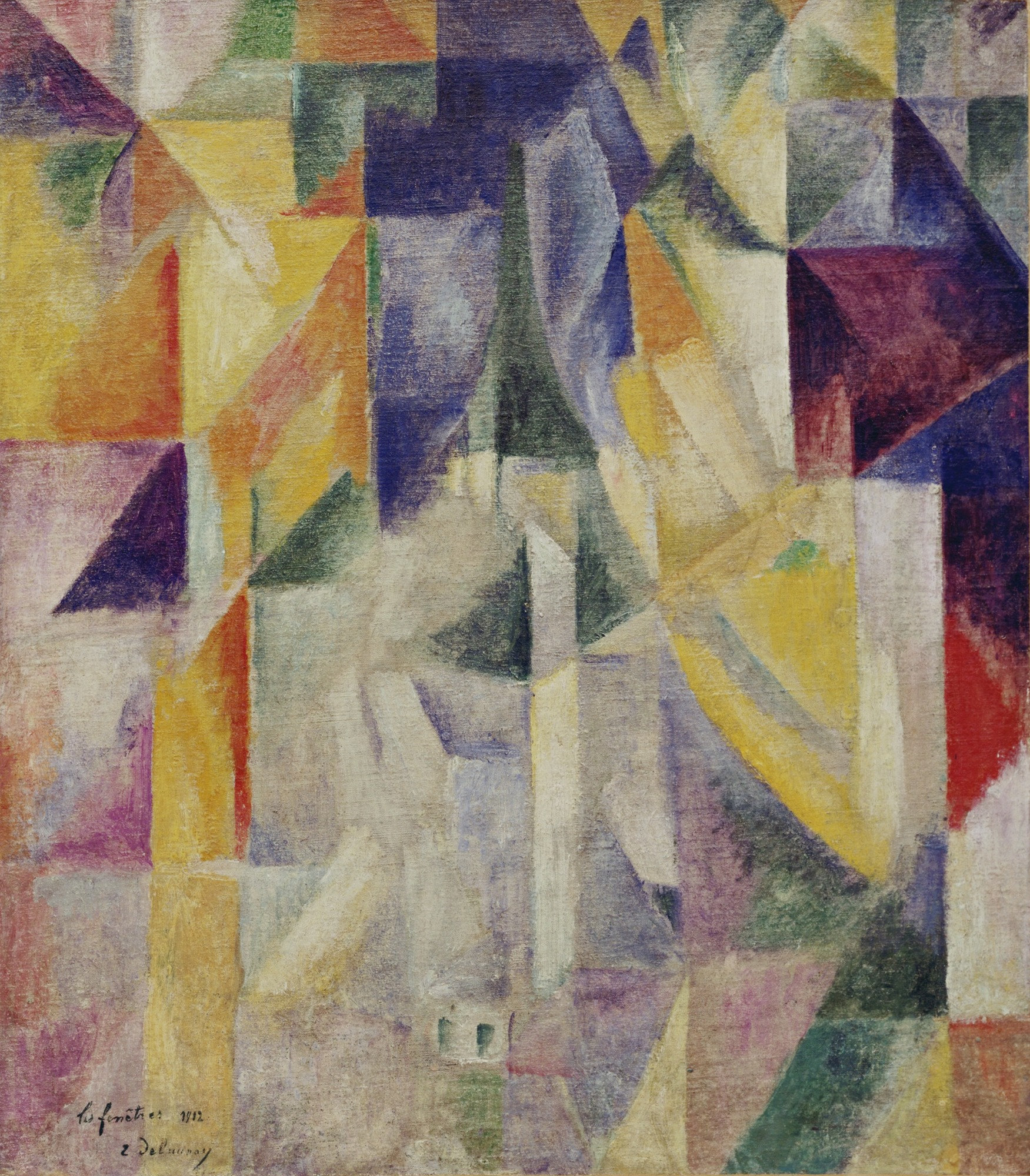
- Artist: Robert Delaunay
- Year: 1912
- Medium: oil and wax on canvas
- Dimensions: 79.9 x 70 cm
- Location: Museum of Modern Art, New York

Windows is a series of paintings created between 1912 and 1913 by the French painter Robert Delaunay. The paintings are oil and wax on canvas, and they mark Delaunay's turn towards abstraction and interest in color. The fragmented compositions of colored shapes are prime examples of Delaunay's use of simultaneous contrast. The title Windows can be interpreted literally as an indication that the pictures represent views from windows, but it also may figuratively refer to the human eye as a window to the visual world.

== Background ==
Delaunay had begun to present Impressionist paintings in 1904 at the Salon des indépendants. He then incorporated ideas derived from the scientific work of Eugène Chevreul on color, the paintings of Seurat, and then Cézanne, whose work he discovered in 1907 when a major retrospective was dedicated to him.

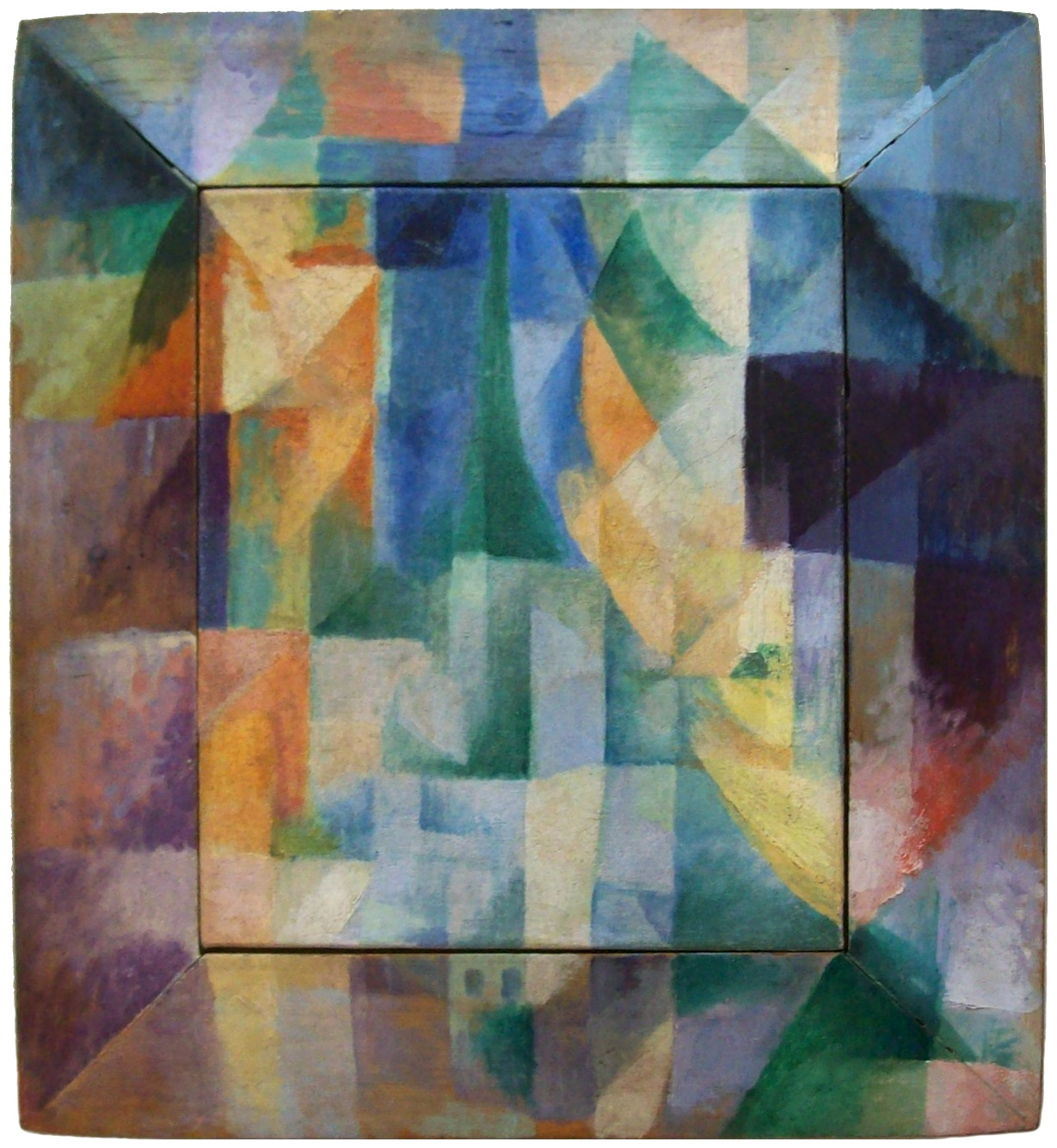
Robert Delaunay, 1912, Les Fenêtres simultanée sur la ville (Simultaneous Windows on the City), 40 x 46 cm, Kunsthalle Hamburg

In 1910, Vassili Kandinsky created the first entirely abstract painting, titled Abstract watercolor, which provoked controversy. He also produced his book Concerning the Spiritual in Art, which outlined his ideas on abstraction, and which Delaunay read with great interest. With the help of his wife Sonia, Robert Delaunay translated it from the original German. He then entered into a correspondence with Kandinsky and with Paul Klee. Modern art then turned toward abstraction, and Guillaume Apollinaire proclaimed in 1912 the birth of a new art : "The new painters paint works where there is no veritable subject."

At this time, Delaunay also conducted much research on colors and the law of simultaneous contrast. With Sonia, he created "simultanism," a technique of finding pictorial harmony through the simultaneous arrangement of colors. Delaunay embraced this new style around the same time some of his peers were partaking in the cubism movement. As opposed to the cubists, who worked in an earth-toned palette, Delaunay turned to the use of vibrant colors, which were characteristic of his abstract paintings, including those in the Windows series. In regards to this shift in Delaunay's approach to painting, Apollinaire stated that "Delaunay, for his part, has been quietly inventing an art of pure color." Apollinaire was also responsible for coining the term 'orphism' which is an artistic movement that Delaunay and his Windows series have been closely associated with.

== Analysis ==
The paintings in the Windows series are abstract but they were not entirely non-figurative. The paintings are intended to represent the view of Paris out a window, and upon close inspection, the viewer may be able to make out the figure of the Eiffel Tower. Delaunay's goal was to make this form visible through the use of simultaneous contrast and the dynamics of color. By juxtaposing either similar or contrasting colors next to each other, Delaunay is able to convey a sense of depth and space. Delaunay organizes the compositions by color; he typically adheres to one color to represent the Eiffel Tower and he makes the window evident by making the colors along the edges of the work contrast the colors towards the center. Furthermore, in most of the works of the series, he groups warm tones together and cool tones together, with the cool tones towards the center and the warm tones towards the outer edge of the paintings. All of the colors are bright and evoke a feeling of light coming through a window.

Delaunay does not intend to represent reality as we observe it, but instead he attempts to represent the act of seeing itself. Through the fragmenting of the composition and placement of color, Delaunay slows the gaze of the viewer. He was particularly interested in how what the eye sees is not the same as visual perception. He wanted to demonstrate how visual perception also relies on previous knowledge, hence the reason why the Eiffel Tower is apparent in the paintings of this series. Furthermore, because of what is known about space and depth, the viewer is able to perceive space and depth just based on the juxtaposition of certain colors.

Windows take as their point of departure the representation of light and the dynamics of color. Even if these paintings represent exterior reality, they are however considered as abstract entities because the object has lost its importance. Contrary to Kandinsky, Delaunay did not realize his paintings through introspection, but in directly observing nature, as he explained in a letter to August Macke, from 1912 : "One thing is indispensable for me, and that is direct observation, in nature, of its luminous essence. I do not say precisely with a palette in hand (even though I am not against notes taken from immediate nature, I work a lot from nature, as one says vulgarly, 'in front of the subject'). But where I attach great importance is direct observation of the movement of colors. It is only thus that I found the laws of complementary and simultaneous contrast of colors that nourishes the rhythm of vision itself." In refusing all a priori systems, he distances himself from the cerebral approach of artists such as Malévitch or Mondrian.

== Paintings in the series ==
List of some of the paintings:

- Windows, oil on canvas, 35 × 91 cm, Philadelphia Museum of Art
- Windows over the City, oil on canvas, 53 × 207 cm, Museum Folkwang, Essen
- The Window (La Fenêtre), oil on canvas, 45,8 × 37,5 cm, Musée de Grenoble
- Les Fenêtres simultanées sur la ville, oil on canvas, 46 × 40 cm, Hamburger Kunsthalle
- Windows Open Simultaneously 1st Part, 3rd Motif (1912), Solomon R. Guggenheim Museum, New York
- Simultaneously Open Windows, oil on canvas, 46 × 37,5 cm, Tate galleries, London
- The Windows over the City (First Part, Second Motif), oil, on card, 39 × 29,6 cm, Sonia Delaunay collection, Paris
- A Window, oil on canvas 110 × 90 cm, Musée National d'Art Moderne, Paris
