= Homage to Blériot =

Painting by Robert Delaunay

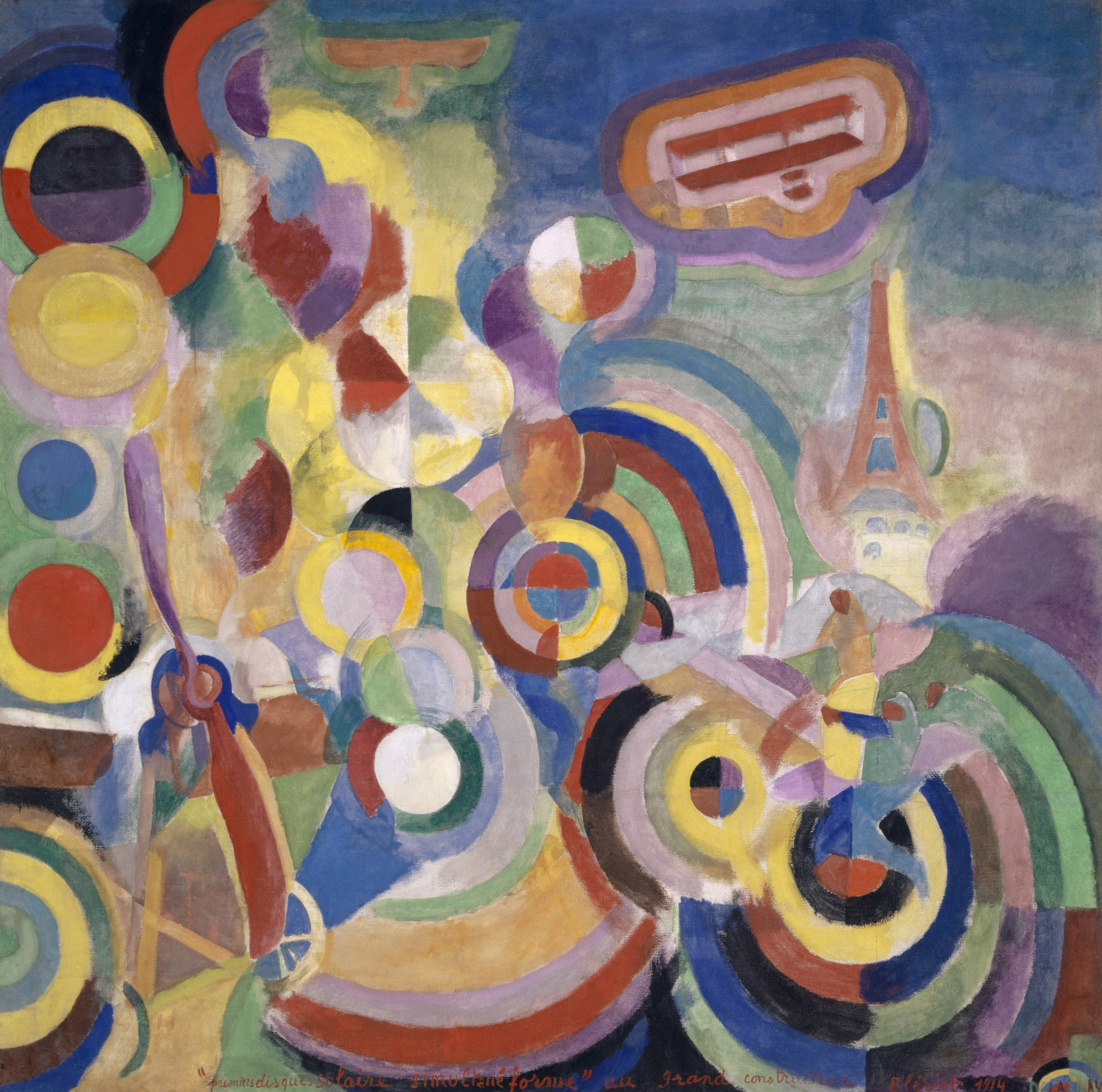
- Artist: Robert Delaunay
- Year: 1914
- Medium: Glue tempera on canvas
- Dimensions: 250 cm × 251 cm (98 in × 99 in)
- Location: Kunstmuseum Basel, Basel

Homage to Blériot is a tempera on canvas painting by French painter Robert Delaunay, from 1914. It is held at the Kunstmuseum Basel. Another version of the same painting is held at the Museum of Grenoble. These paintings belong to the series Disks.

== Description ==
This canvas celebrates the French aviation pioneer and constructor Louis Blériot, in a typical simultaneist composition, by notably representing symbols of progress, namely a biplane, seen flying above the Eiffel Tower, in Paris, at the right, and a propeller, at the left. However, the inscription left below the canvas reads "first simultaneous solar disks form" to the great constructor Blériot, suggesting that the painting is dedicated to Blériot, as the constructor and not as the pilot of the biplane.

The composition is filled with the typical orphic colourful solar disks and geometric shapes, with influences also from neo-impressionism, cubism and futurism. The Disks series was inspired by the colour theory of French chemist Michel Eugène Chevreul, and the concept of the simultaneous contrasts of colours.

Delaunay described the work the following way: “Blériot–1914 A simultaneous solar disc. Creation of a constructive disc. Solar fireworks. Depth and life of the sun. Constructive mobility of the solar spectrum; dawn, fire, evolution of airplanes. Everything is roundness, sun, earth, horizons, intense plenitude of life, a poetry which one cannot render into language... The driving force in the picture. Solar strength and strength of the earth.”

== Art market ==
A study for the final painting sold by $1,567,500 at Christie's, on 16 November 2016.
