= Robert Delaunay =

French painter (1885–1941)

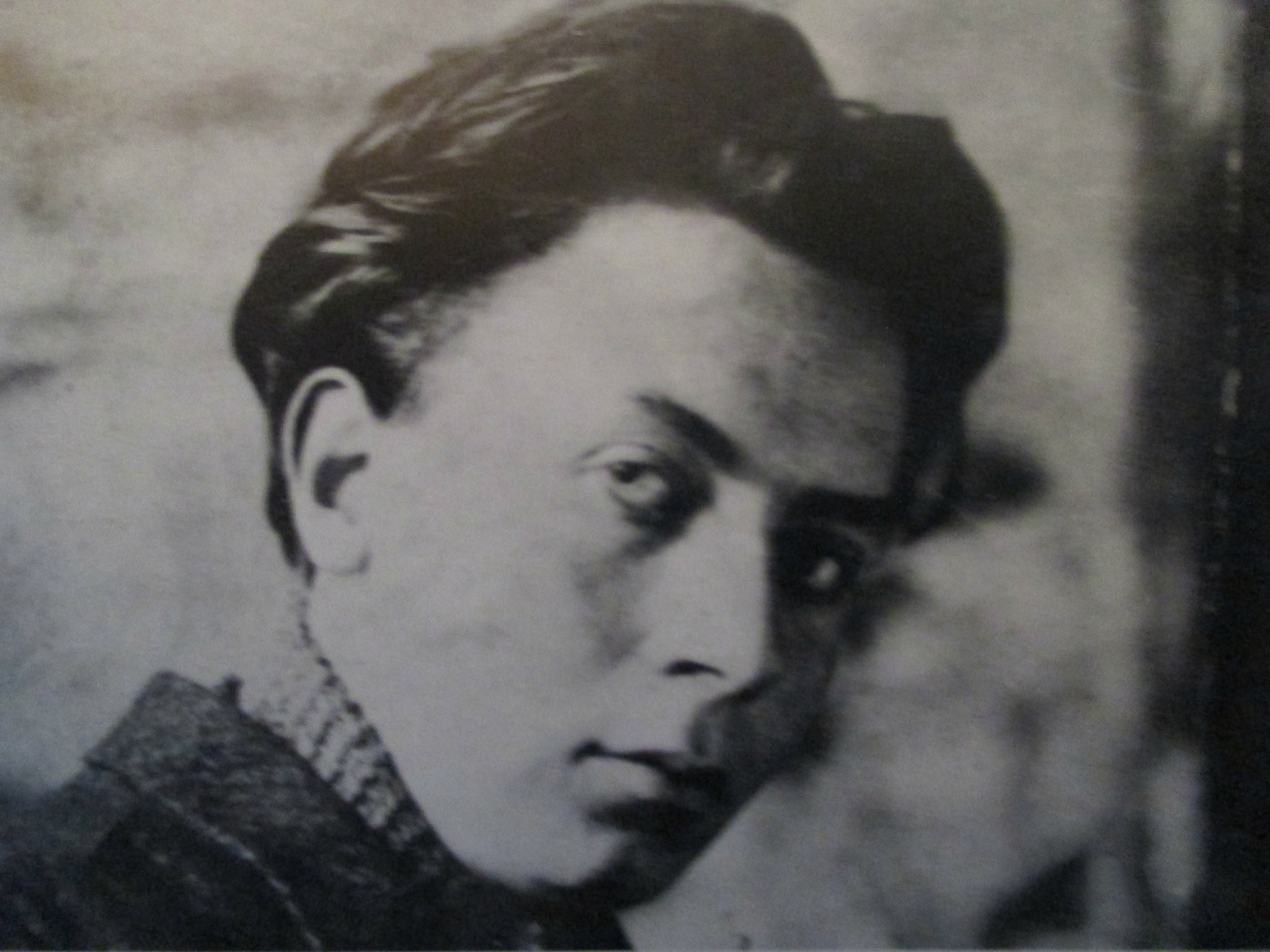
- Robert Delaunay
- Born: Robert-Victor-Felix Delaunay; 12 April 1885; Paris, France
- Died: 25 October 1941 (aged 56); Montpellier, France
- Known for: Painting
- Movement: Divisionism, Cubism, Orphism, Abstract art, School of Paris

Robert Delaunay (French: [ʁɔbɛʁ dəlonɛ]; 12 April 1885 – 25 October 1941) was a French artist of the School of Paris movement who, with his wife Sonia Delaunay and others, co-founded the Orphism art movement, noted for its use of strong colours and geometric shapes. His later works were more abstract. His work includes the bold use of color, and shows his clear love of experimentation with both depth and tone.

== Overview ==
From 1912 to 1914, Delaunay's nonfigurative paintings focused on color. His early paintings were deeply rooted in Neo-Impressionism, which he abandoned later. His writings on color, which were influenced by scientists and theoreticians, were largely intuitive and could sometimes be random statements based on the belief that color was a thing in itself, with its own powers of expression and form. He believed that painting was a purely visual art that depended on intellectual elements, and perception was in the impact of colored light on the eye.

His theories about color and light influenced many artists such as Stanton Macdonald-Wright, Morgan Russell, Patrick Henry Bruce, Der Blaue Reiter, August Macke, Franz Marc, Paul Klee, Thomas Hart Benton, Lyonel Feininger and dozens more. The poet and art critic Guillaume Apollinaire was also influenced by Delaunay's theories of color and quoted from them to explain Orphism, which he had named.

== Biography ==
=== Early life ===
Robert Delaunay was born in Paris, the son of George Delaunay and Countess Berthe Félicie de Rose. While he was a child, Delaunay's parents divorced, and he was raised by his mother's sister Marie and her husband Charles Damour, in La Ronchère near Bourges. When he failed his final exam and said he wanted to become a painter, his uncle in 1902 sent him to Ronsin's atelier to study Decorative Arts in the Belleville district of Paris.

=== Career beginnings ===
At age 19, Delaunay left Ronsin to focus entirely on painting and contributed six works to the Salon des Indépendants in 1904. He traveled to Brittany, where he was influenced by the group of Pont-Aven; and, in 1906, he contributed works he painted in Brittany to the 22nd Salon des Indépendants, where he met "Le Douanier" Henri Rousseau.

Delaunay formed a close friendship at this time with Jean Metzinger, with whom he shared an exhibition at a gallery run by Berthe Weill early in 1907. The two of them were singled out by the art critic Louis Vauxcelles in 1907 as Divisionists who used large, mosaic-like 'cubes' to construct small but highly symbolic compositions.

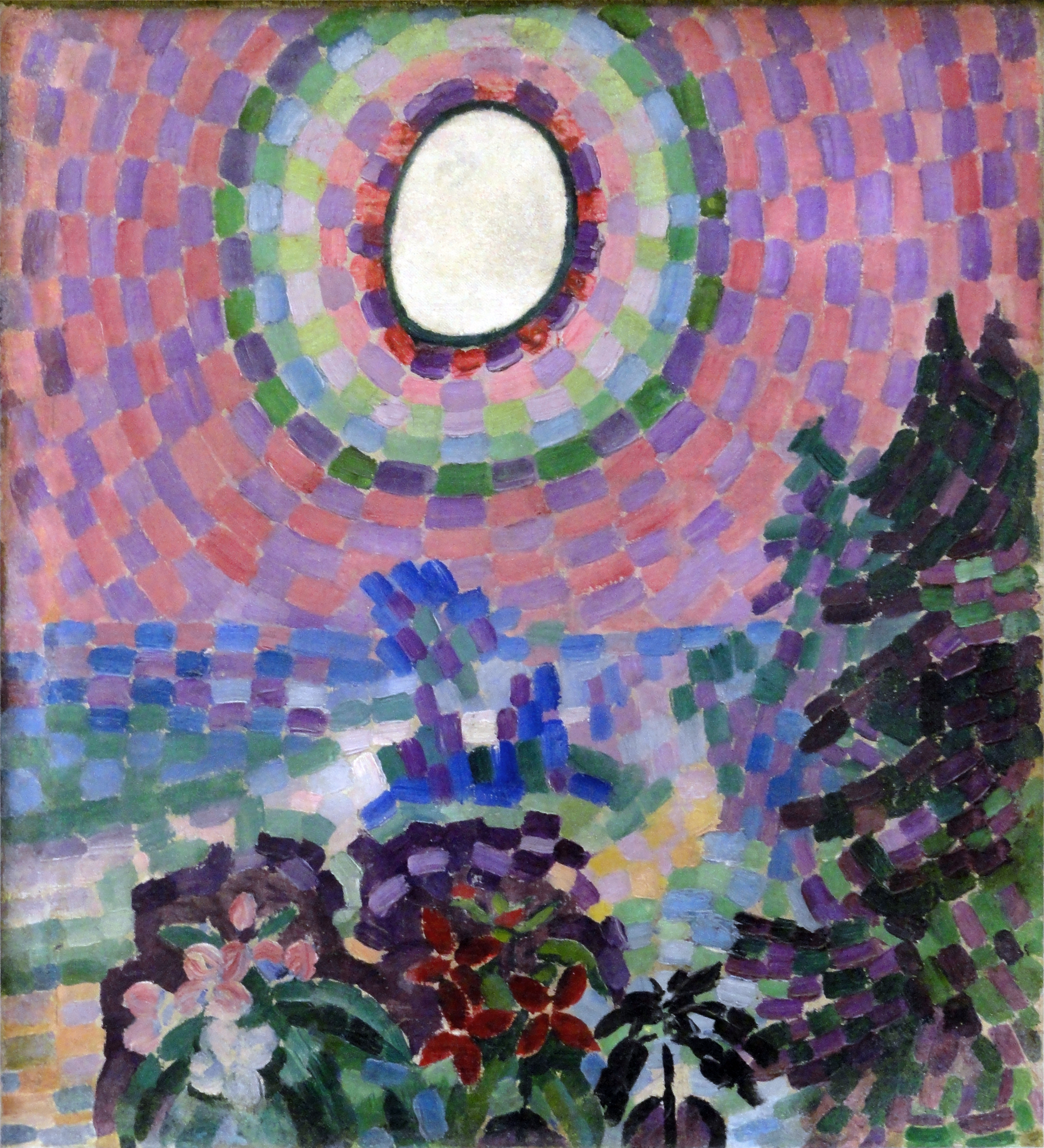
Robert Delaunay, Paysage au disque, 1906–07, oil on canvas, 55 x 46 cm, Musée national d'art moderne (MNAM), Centre Georges Pompidou, Paris

Robert Herbert writes: "Metzinger's Neo-Impressionist period was somewhat longer than that of his close friend Delaunay... The height of his Neo-Impressionist work was in 1906 and 1907, when he and Delaunay did portraits of each other (Art market, London, and Museum of Fine Arts, Houston) in prominent rectangles of pigment. (In the sky of Coucher de soleil no. 1, 1906–07, Collection Rijksmuseum Kröller-Müller, is the solar disk which Delaunay was later to make into a personal emblem)." Herbert describes the vibrating image of the sun in Metzinger's painting, and so too of Delaunay's Paysage au disque (1906–07), as "an homage to the decomposition of spectral light that lay at the heart of Neo-Impressionist color theory..."

Metzinger, followed closely by Delaunay—the two often painting together in 1906 and 1907—would develop a new sub-style of Neo-Impressionism that had great significance shortly thereafter within the context of their Cubist works. Piet Mondrian developed a similar mosaic-like Divisionist technique circa 1909. The Futurists later (1909–1916) would incorporate the style, under the influence of Gino Severini's Parisian works (from 1907 onward), into their dynamic paintings and sculpture.

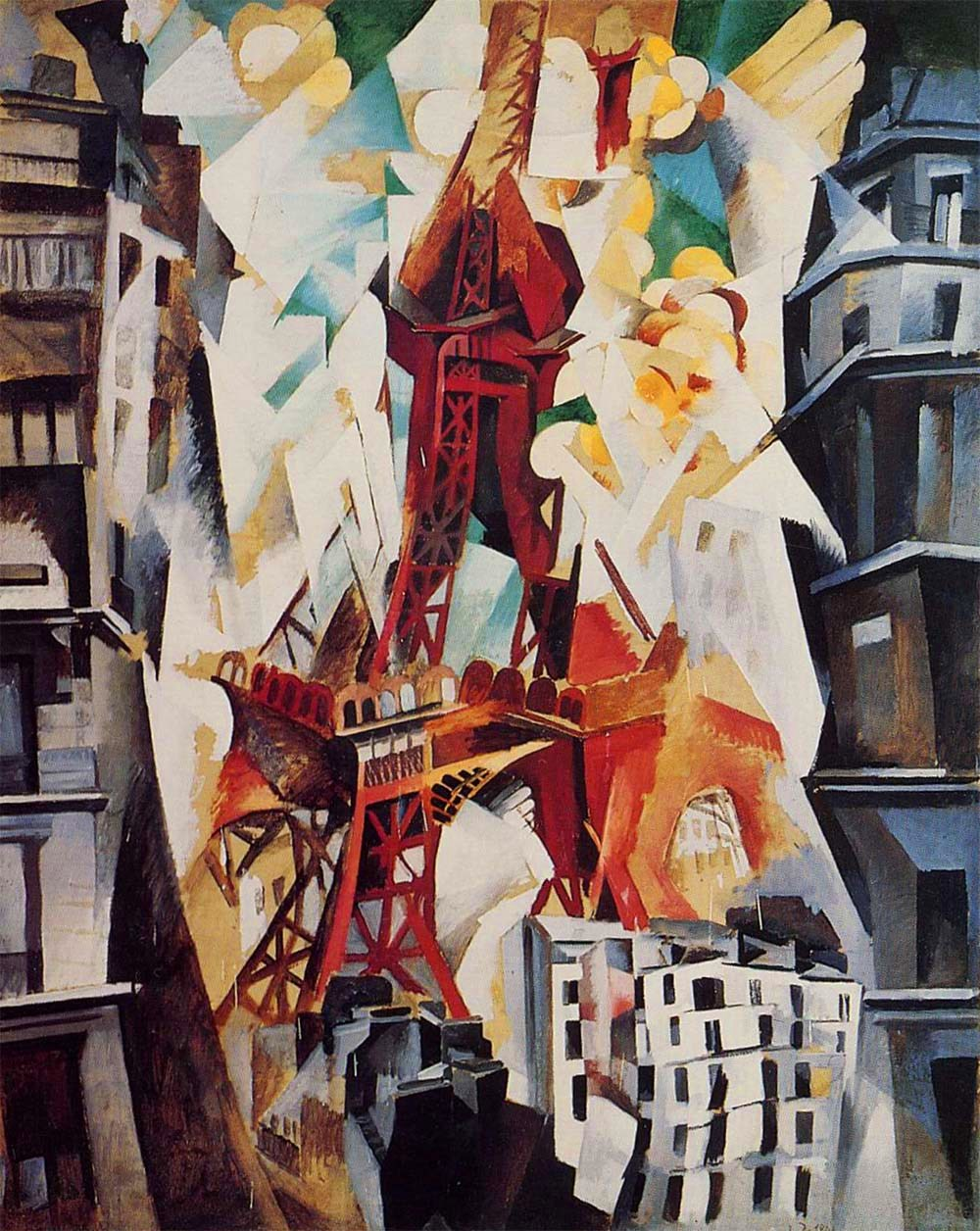
Robert Delaunay. Champs de Mars: The Red Tower, 1911, oil on canvas, 160.7 x 128.6 cm, Art Institute of Chicago.

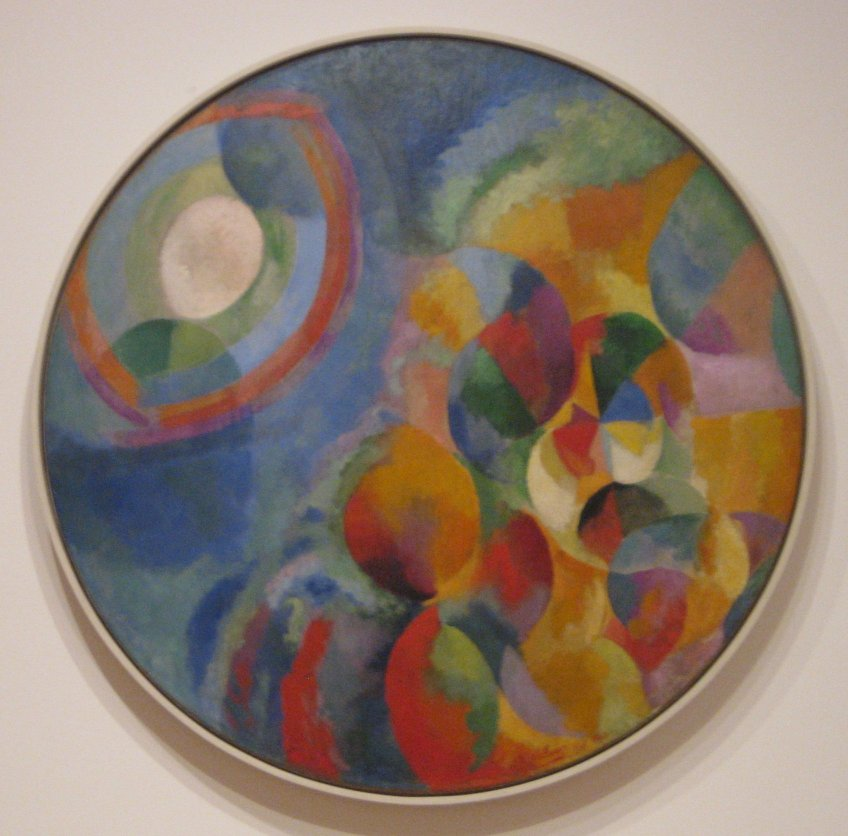
Robert Delaunay, Simultaneous Contrasts: Sun and Moon, 1912–13, oil on canvas, 53 in. (134.5 cm) in diameter, Museum of Modern Art

In 1908, after a term in the military working as a regimental librarian, he met fellow artist Sonia Terk; at the time she was married to a German art dealer whom she would soon divorce. In 1909, Delaunay began to paint a series of studies of the city of Paris and the Eiffel Tower, the Eiffel Tower series.

The following year, he married Terk, and, together with a few others, they founded the Orphism art movement. The couple settled in a studio apartment in Paris, where their son Charles was born in January 1911. The same year, at the invitation of Wassily Kandinsky, Delaunay joined The Blue Rider (Der Blaue Reiter), a Munich-based group of artists. Delaunay was also successful in Germany, Switzerland, and Russia. He participated in the first Blaue Reiter exhibition in Munich and sold four works. Delaunay's paintings encouraged an enthusiastic response with Blaue Reiter. The Blaue Reiter connections led to the article by Erwin von Busse titled "Robert Delaunay's Methods of Composition", which appeared in the 1912 Blaue Reiter Almanac. Delaunay would go to exhibit in February of that year, in the second Blaue Reiter exhibition in Munich and Knave of Diamonds in Moscow.

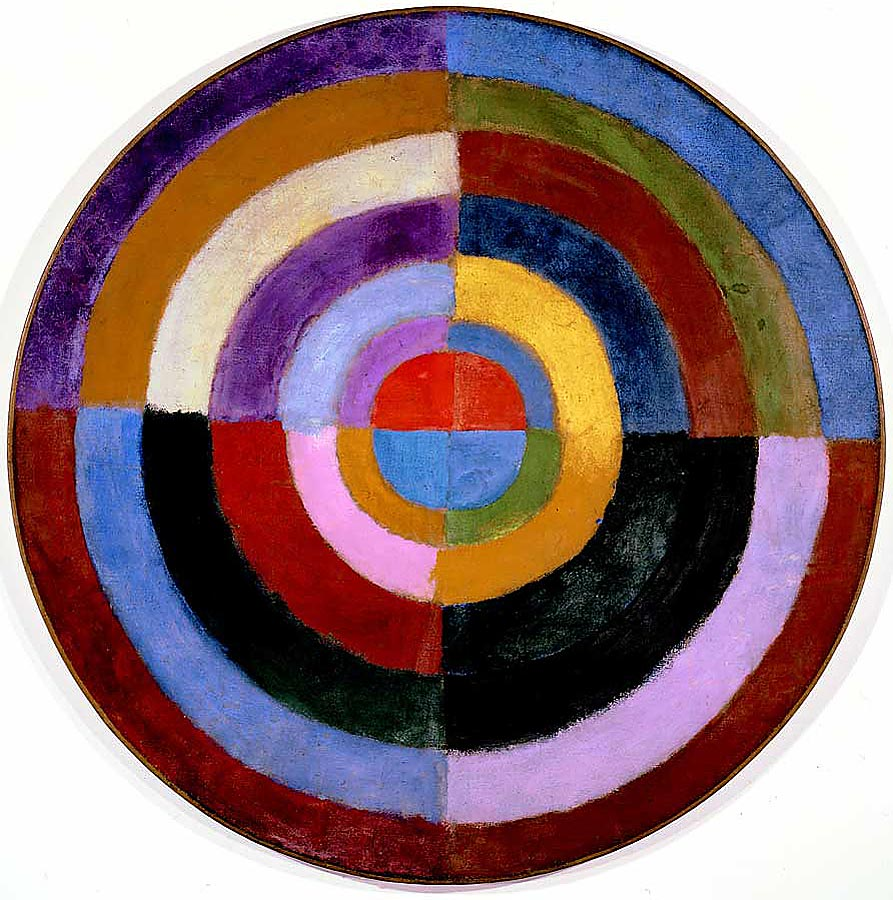
Robert Delaunay. Le Premier Disque, 1912–1913, oil on canvas. 134 x 52.7 inches (circular), Esther Grether Familensammlung (Foundation), Switzerland.

"This happened in 1912. Cubism was in full force. I made paintings that seemed like prisms compared to the Cubism my fellow artists were producing. I was the heretic of Cubism. I had great arguments with my comrades who banned color from their palette, depriving it of all elemental mobility. I was accused of returning to Impressionism, of making decorative paintings, etc.… I felt I had almost reached my goal."

1912 was a turning point for Delaunay. On 13 March his first major exhibition in Paris closed after two weeks at the Galerie Barbazanges. The exhibition, organized by the French mathematician and actuary Maurice Princet, showed forty-six works from his early 1906-07 Divisionist period to his Proto-Cubist and Cubist Eiffel Tower paintings from 1909 to 1912. Apollinaire praised those works of the exhibition and proclaimed Delaunay as "an artist who has a monumental vision of the world."

In the 23 March 1912 issue of the satirical magazine L'Assiette au Beurre, the first published suggestion that Delaunay had broken with this group of Cubists appeared, in James Burkley's review of the Salon des Indépendants. Burkley wrote, "The "Cubists", who occupied only a room, have multiplied. Their leaders, Picasso and Braque, have not participated in their grouping, and Delaunay, commonly labeled a Cubist, has wished to isolate himself and declares he has nothing in common with Metzinger or Le Fauconnier."

With Apollinaire, Delaunay traveled to Berlin in January 1913 for an exhibition of his work at Galerie Der Sturm. On their way back to Paris, the two stayed with August Macke in Bonn, where Macke introduced them to Max Ernst. When his painting La ville de Paris was rejected by the Armory Show as being too big he instructed Samuel Halpert to remove all his works from the show.

=== Spanish and Portuguese years (1914–1920) ===
At the outbreak of the First World War in 1914 Sonia and Robert were staying in Fontarabie in Spain. They decided not to return to France and settled in Madrid. In August 1915 they moved to Portugal where they shared a home with Samuel Halpert and Eduardo Viana. With Viana and their friends Amadeo de Souza Cardoso (whom the Delaunays had already met in Paris) and José de Almada Negreiros they discussed an artistic partnership. First declared a deserter, Robert was declared unfit for military duty at the French consulate in Vigo on 23 June 1916.

The Russian Revolution brought an end to the financial support Sonia received from her family in Russia, and a different source of income was needed. In 1917 the Delaunays met Sergei Diaghilev in Madrid. Robert designed the stage for his production of Cleopatra (costume design by Sonia Delaunay). Robert Delaunay illustrates Tour Eiffel for Vicente Huidobro.

Paul Poiret refused a business partnership with Sonia in 1920, citing as one of the reasons her marriage to a deserter. The Der Sturm gallery in Berlin showed works by Sonia and Robert from their Portuguese period the same year.

=== Return to Paris and later life (1921–1941) ===
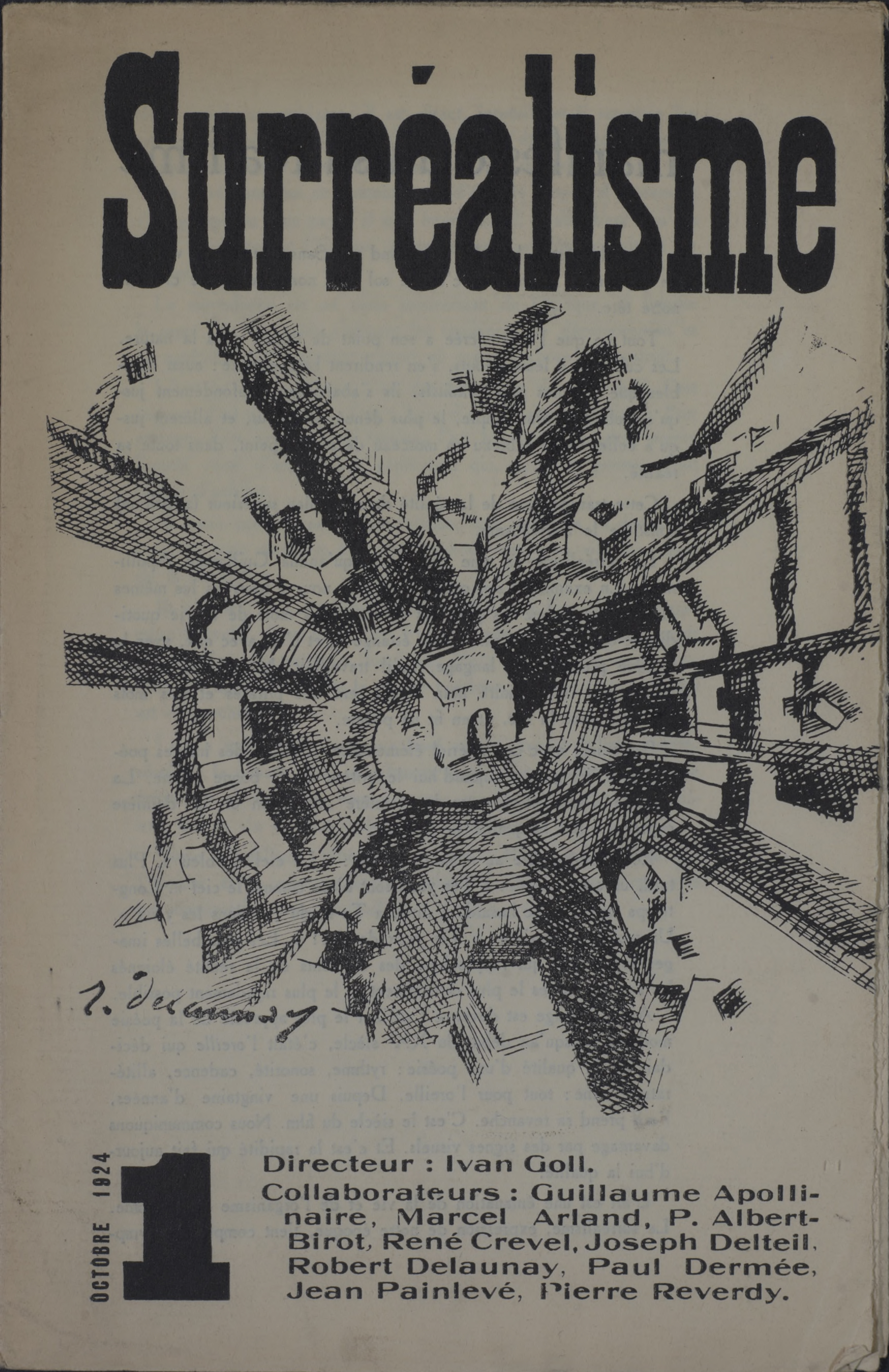
Yvan Goll, Surréalisme, Manifeste du surréalisme, Volume 1, Number 1, 1 October 1924, cover by Robert Delaunay

After the war, in 1921, Robert and Sonia Delaunay returned to Paris. Robert Delaunay continued to work in both figurative and abstract themes, with a brief stint into Surrealism. He met André Breton and Tristan Tzara, who introduced him to both Dadaists and Surrealists. During the 1937 World Fair in Paris, Delaunay participated in the design of the railway and air travel pavilions.

When World War II erupted, the Delaunays moved to the Auvergne region, in an effort to avoid the invading German forces. Suffering from cancer, Delaunay was unable to endure being moved around, and his health deteriorated. He died of cancer on 25 October 1941 in Montpellier at the age of 56. His body was reburied in 1952 in Gambais.

== Gallery ==
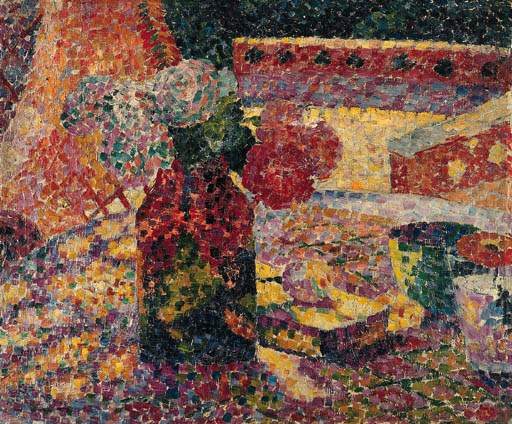
Robert Delaunay, c.1907, Nature morte au vase de fleurs, oil on canvas, 46.4 x 55 cm

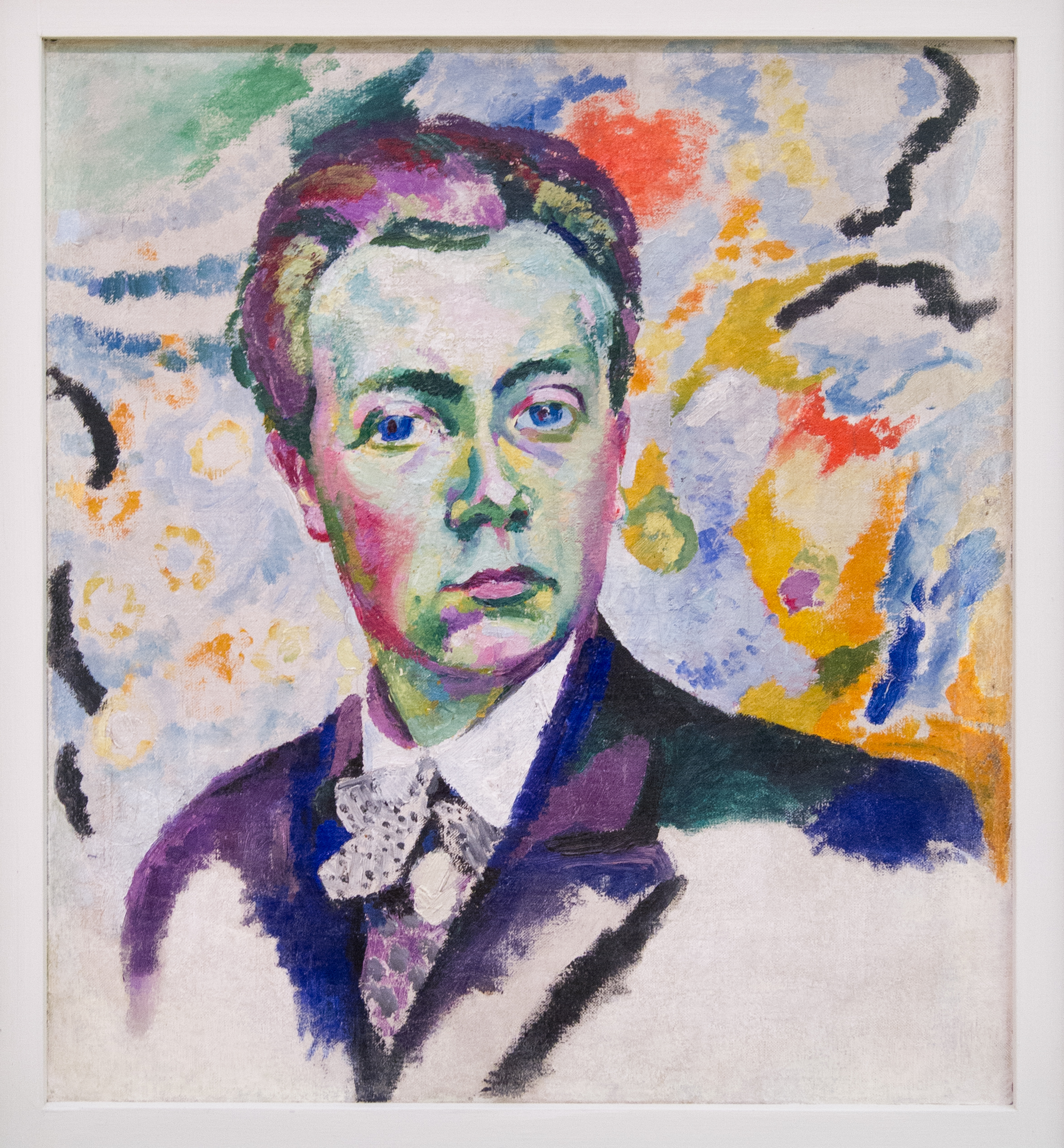
Robert Delaunay, 1905–06, Autoportrait, oil on canvas, 54 x 46 cm, Musée National d'Art Moderne, Paris

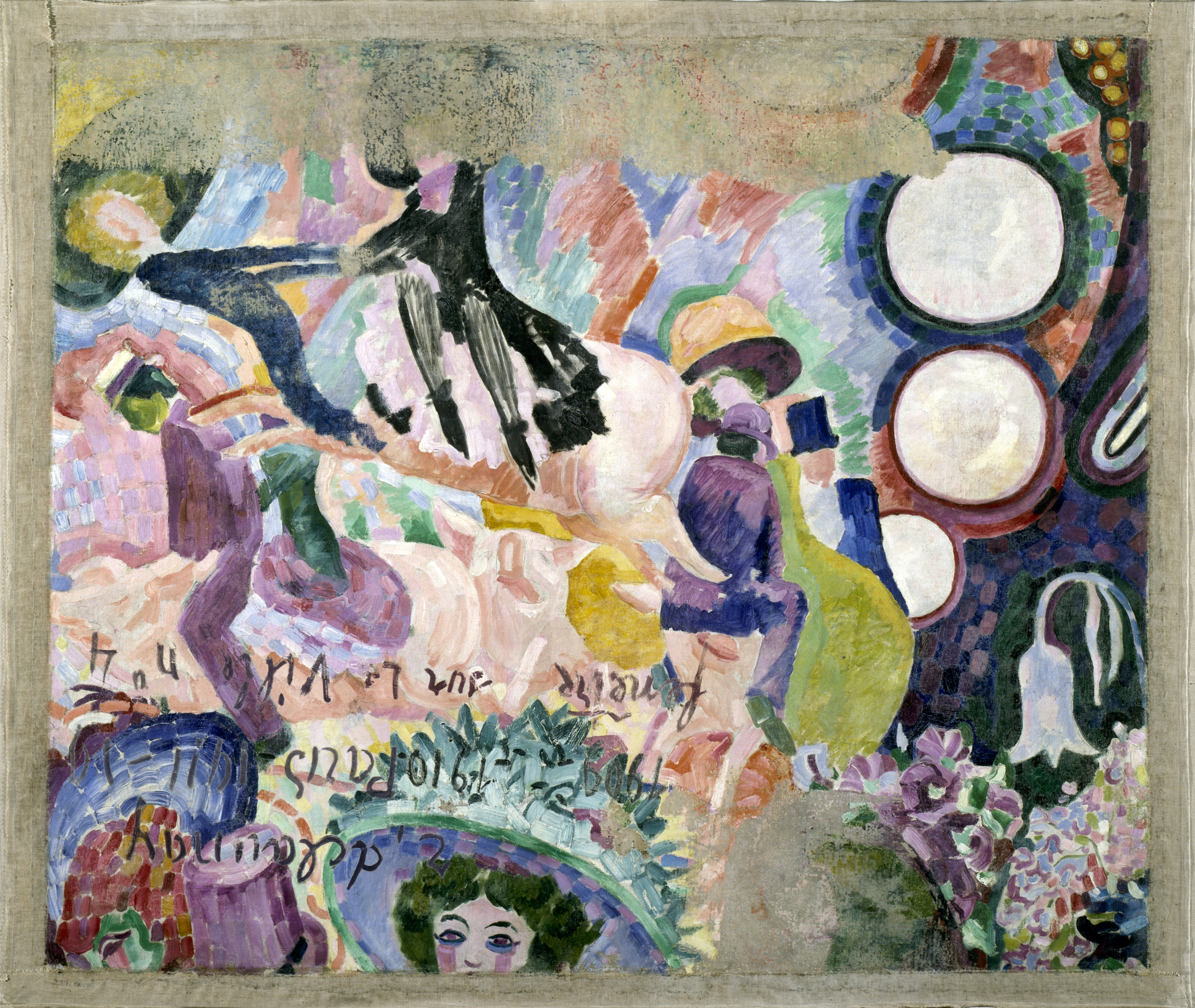
Robert Delaunay, 1906, Carousel of Pigs (Manège de cochons), oil on canvas, 113.7 × 130.8 cm, Solomon R. Guggenheim Museum

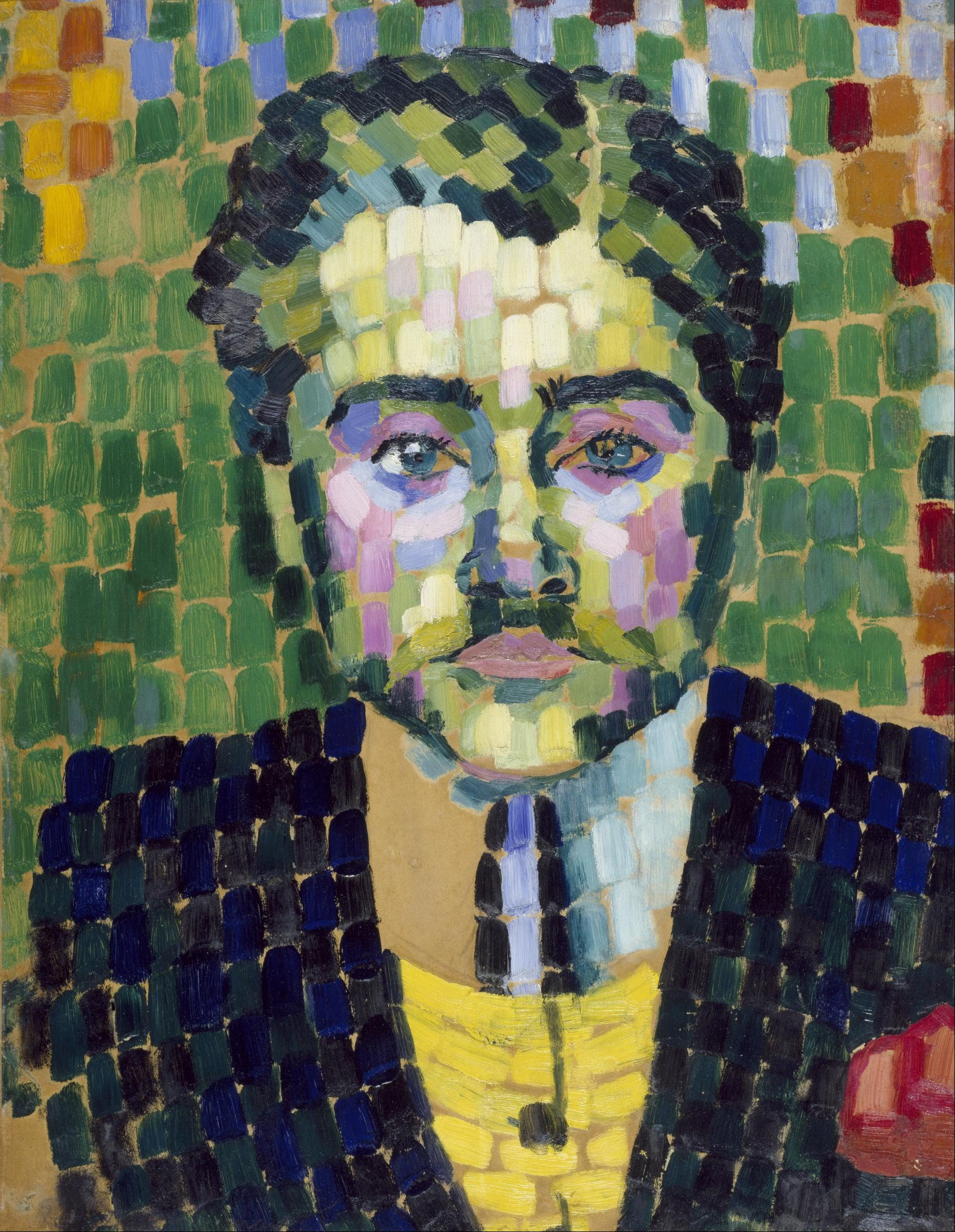
Robert Delaunay, 1906, Jean Metzinger, oil on paper, 54.9 x 43.2 cm, Museum of Fine Arts, Houston

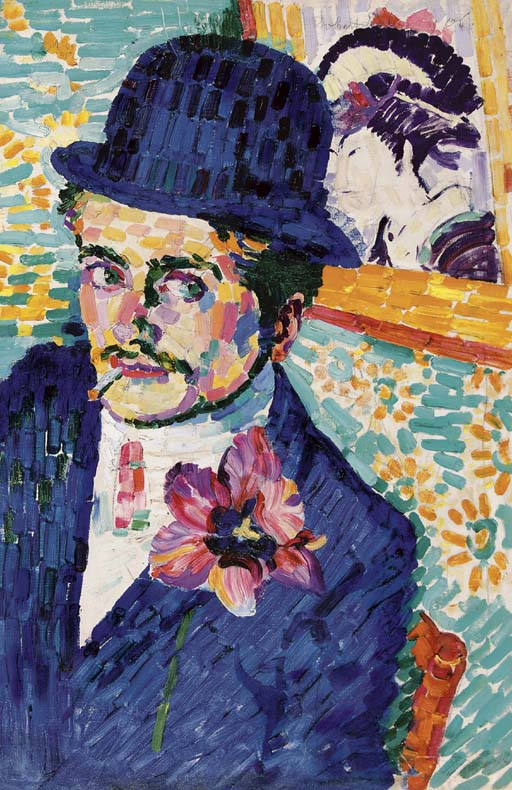
Robert Delaunay, 1906, L'homme à la tulipe (Portrait de M. Jean Metzinger), oil on canvas, 72.4 x 48.5 cm. Exhibited in Paris at the 1906 Salon d'Autome (no. 420) along with a portrait of Delaunay by Metzinger

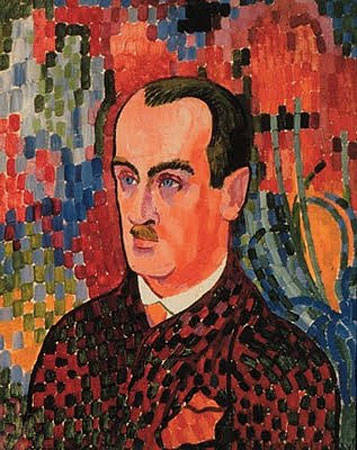
Robert Delaunay, 1907, Portrait of Wilhelm Uhde. Robert Delaunay and Sonia Terk met through the German collector/dealer Wilhelm Uhde, with whom Sonia had been married as she said for "convenience"

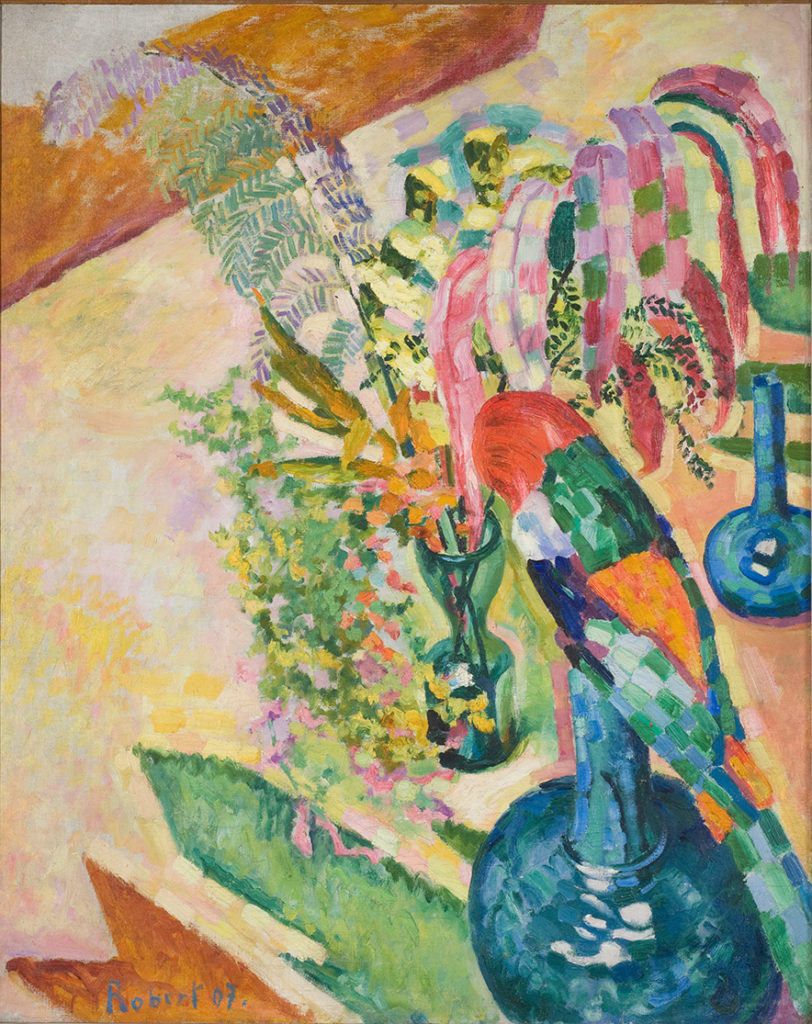
Robert Delaunay, 1907, Still Life with a Parrot, oil on canvas, 82.5 x 66.5 cm, Unterlinden Museum. Another version of that painting belongs to the Thyssen-Bornemisza Museum.

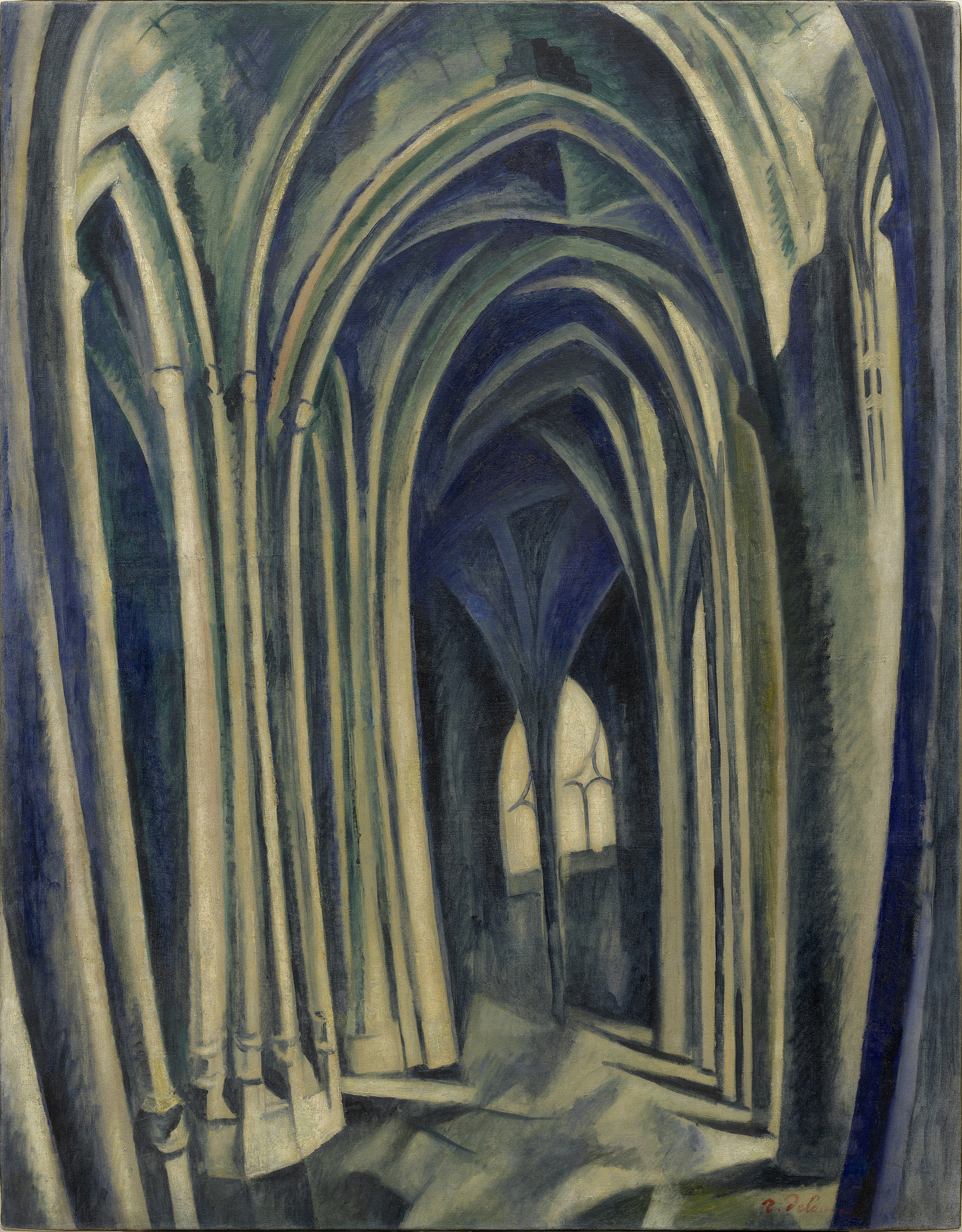
Robert Delaunay, 1909–10, Saint-Séverin No. 3, oil on canvas, 114.1 × 88.6 cm, Solomon R. Guggenheim Museum

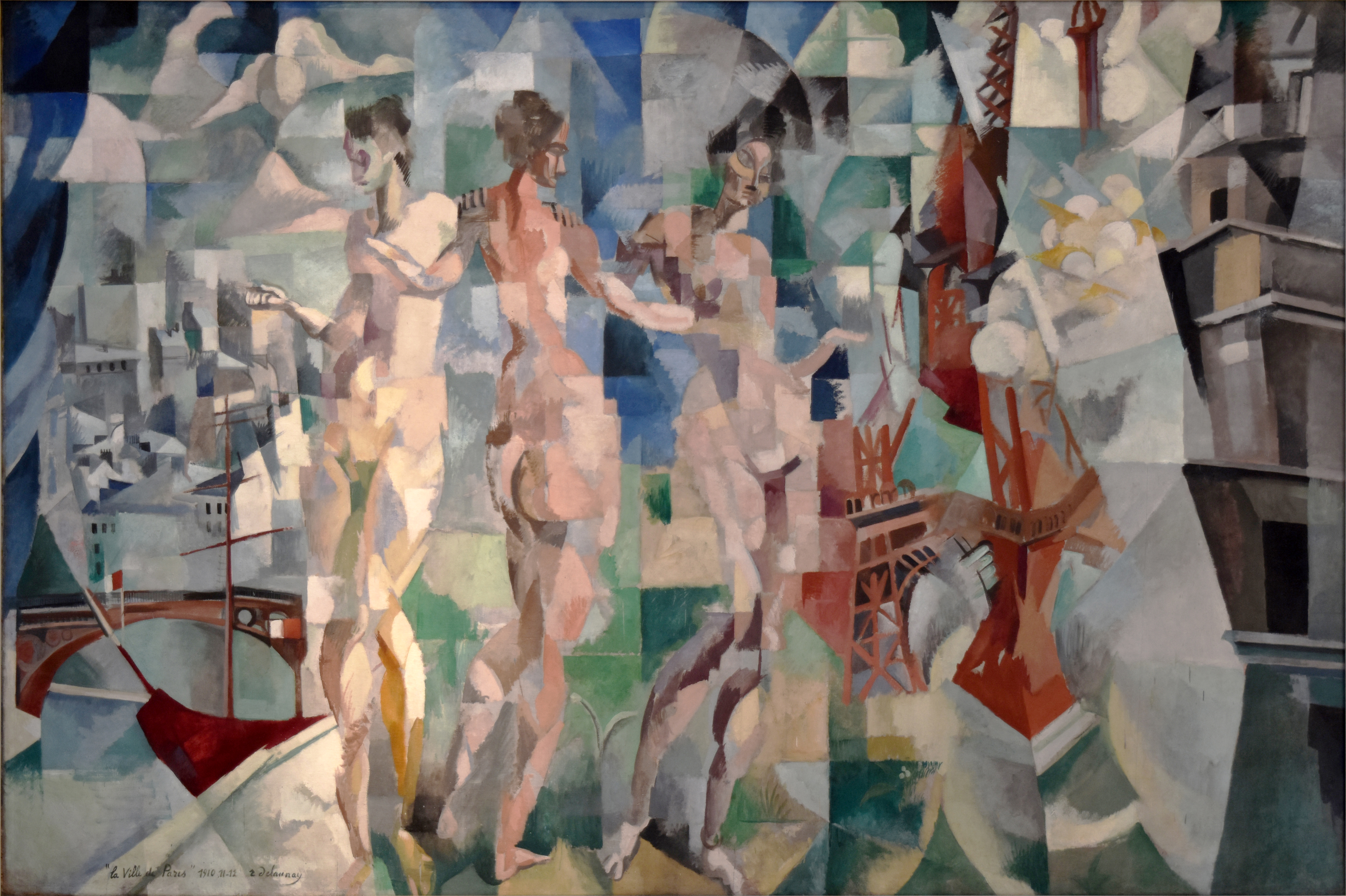
Robert Delaunay, 1910–1912, La Ville de Paris, oil on canvas, 267 × 406 cm, Musée National d'Art Moderne

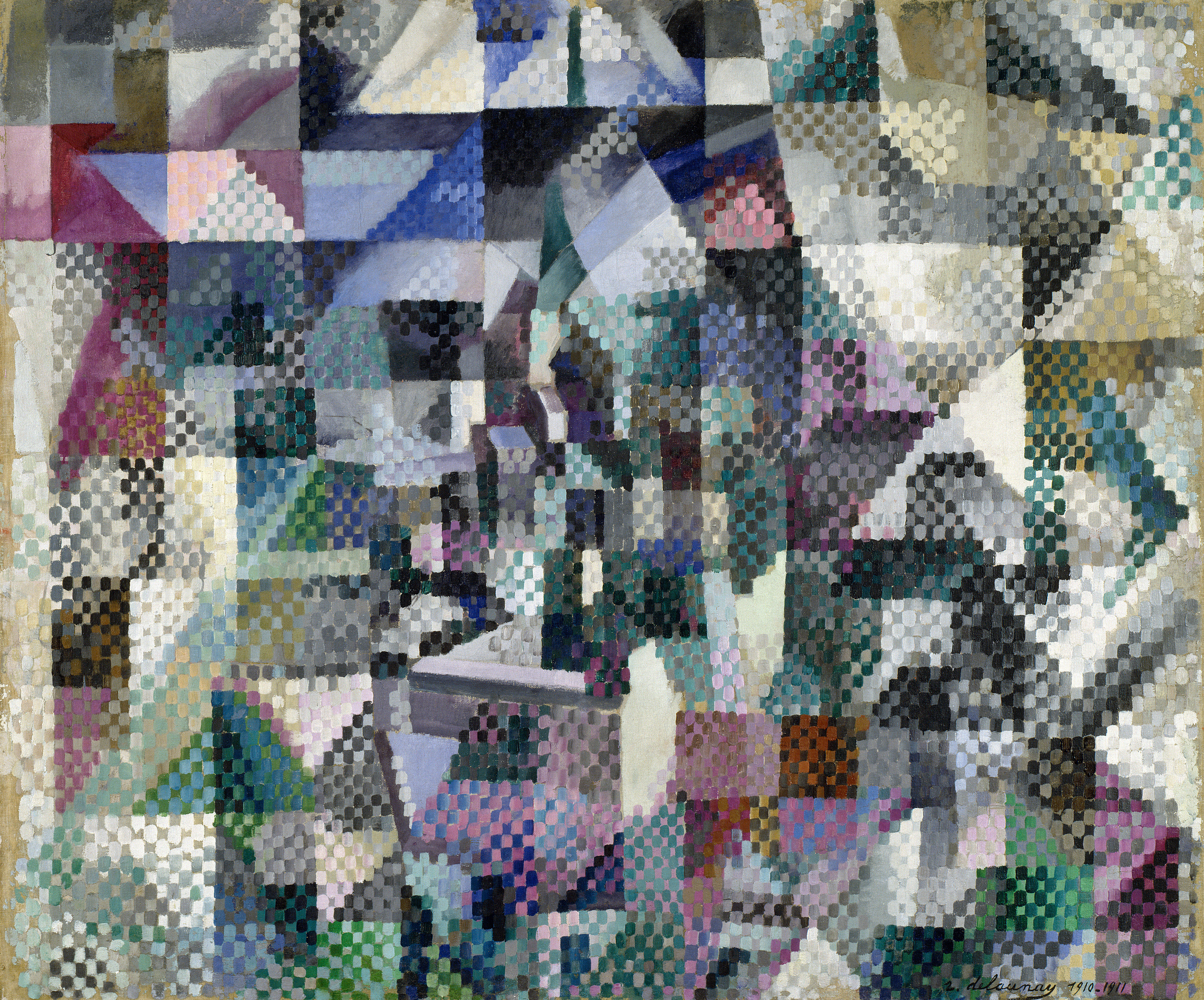
Robert Delaunay, 1911–12, Window on the City No. 3, oil on canvas, 113.7 × 130.8 cm, Solomon R. Guggenheim Museum

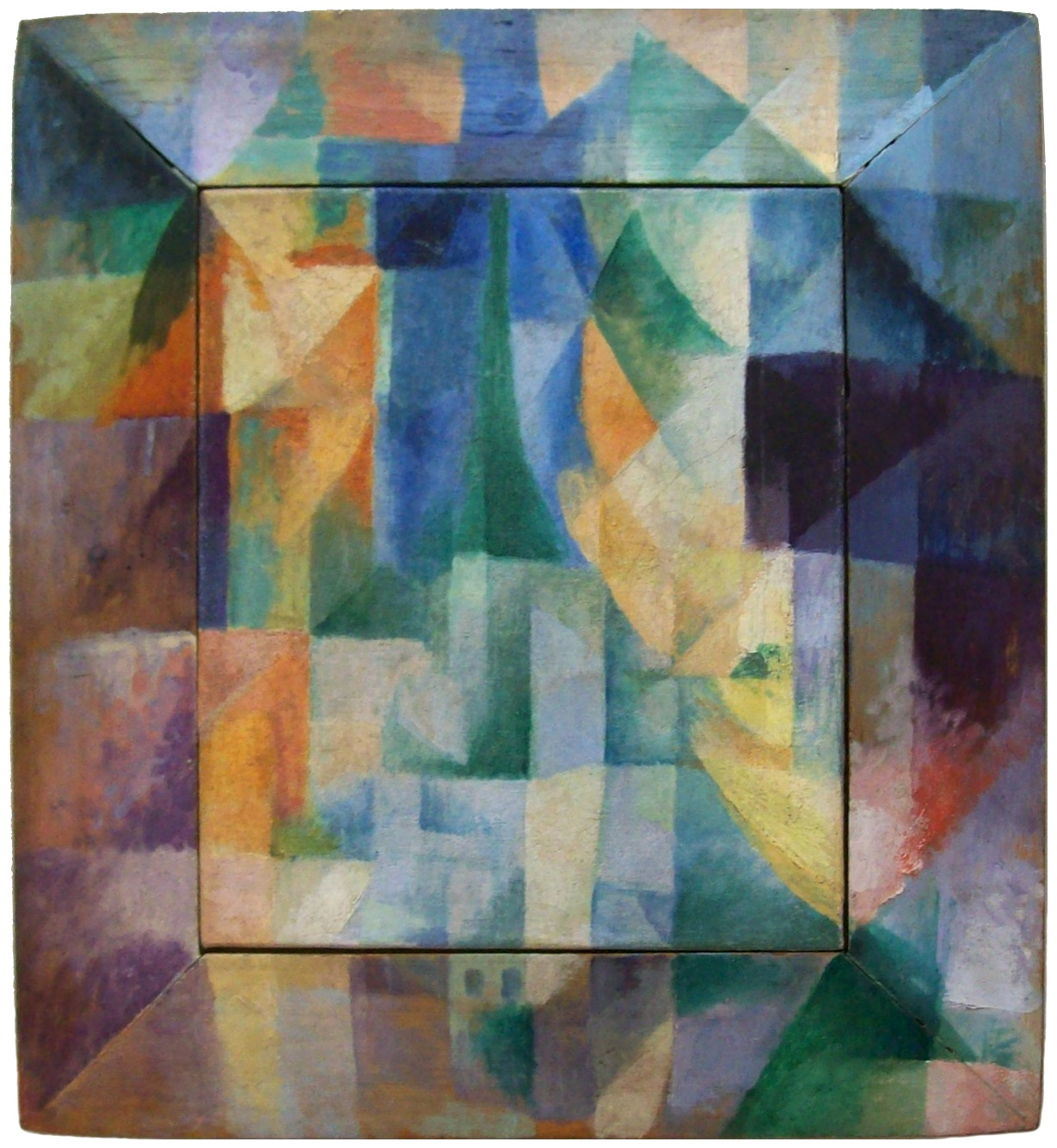
Robert Delaunay, 1912, Simultaneous Windows on the City, 40 x 46 cm, Kunsthalle Hamburg

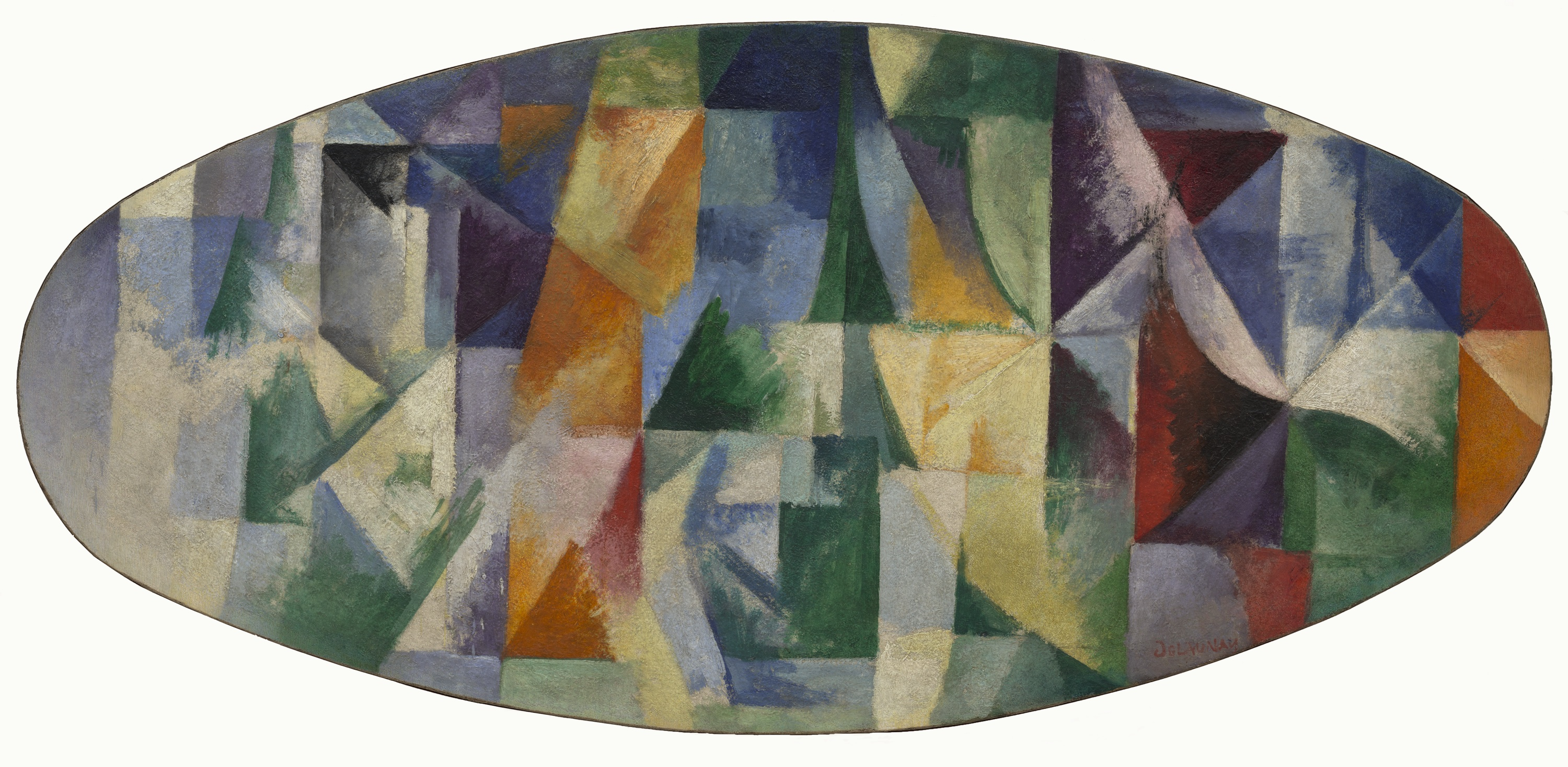
Robert Delaunay, 1912, Windows Open Simultaneously 1st Part, 3rd Motif, oil on canvas, 57 × 123 cm, Solomon R. Guggenheim Museum

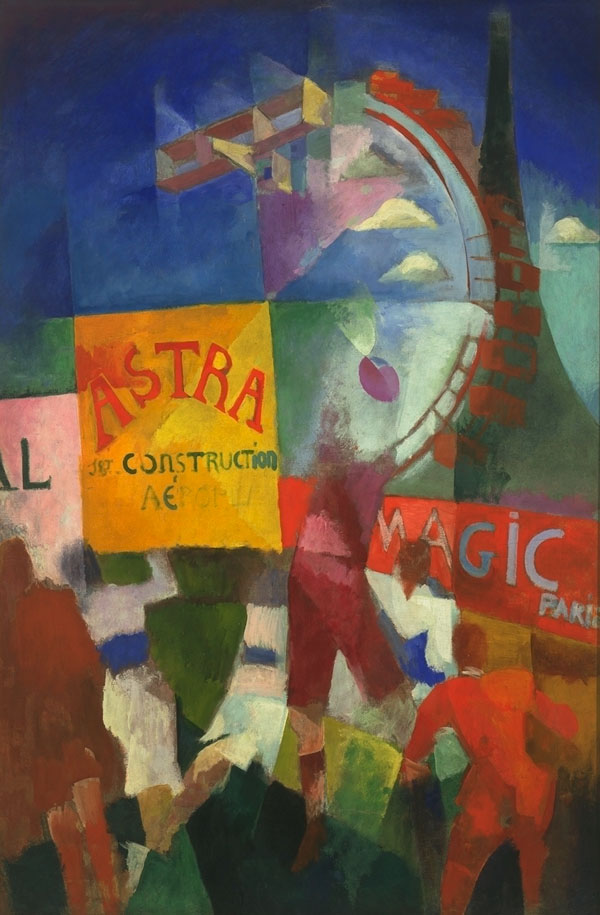
Robert Delaunay, 1913, L'Équipe de Cardiff, oil on canvas, 195 x 130 cm, Van Abbemuseum, Eindhoven

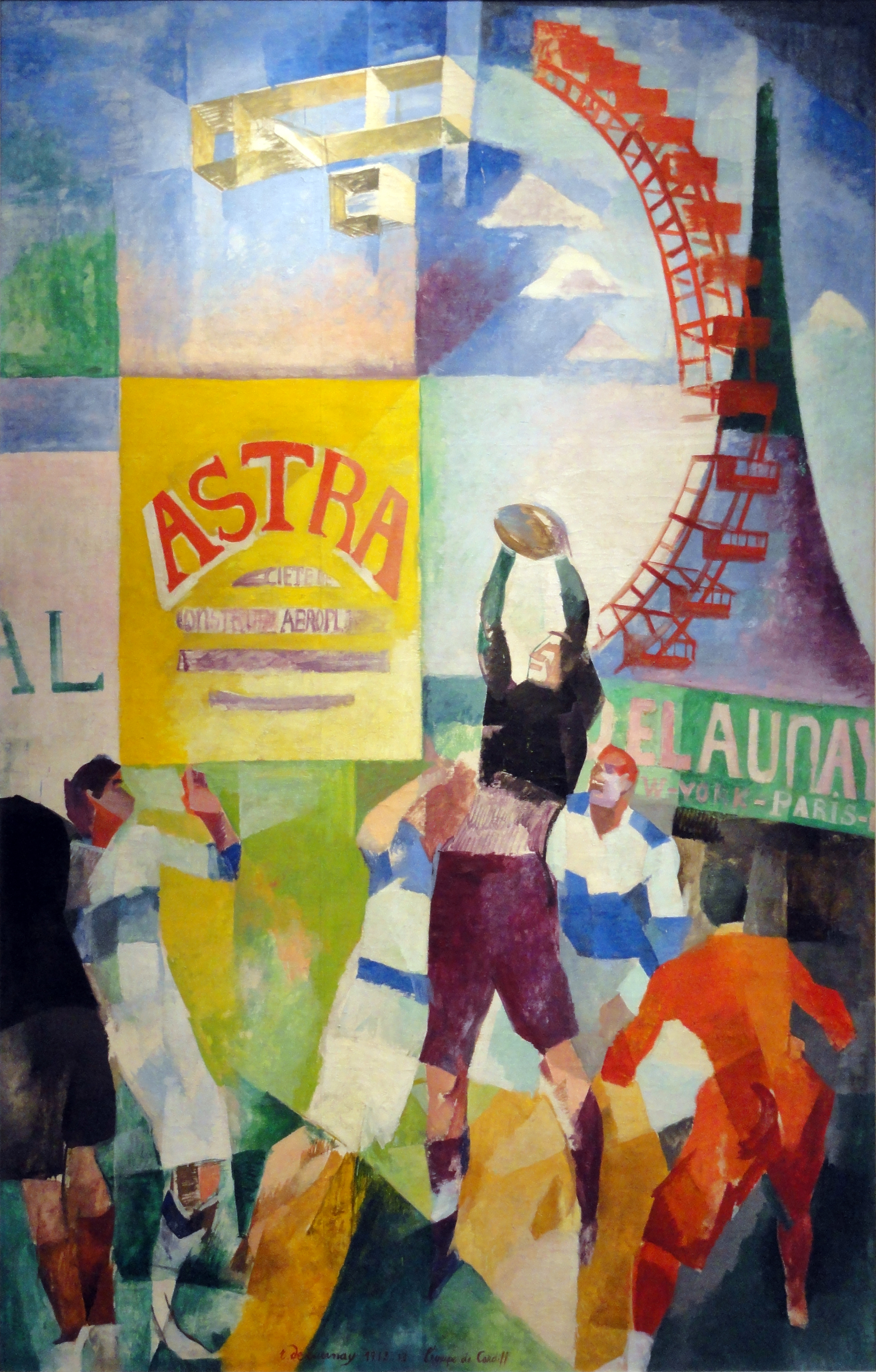
Robert Delaunay, 1913, L'Équipe de Cardiff, oil on canvas, 326 × 208 cm, Musée d'Art Moderne de Paris

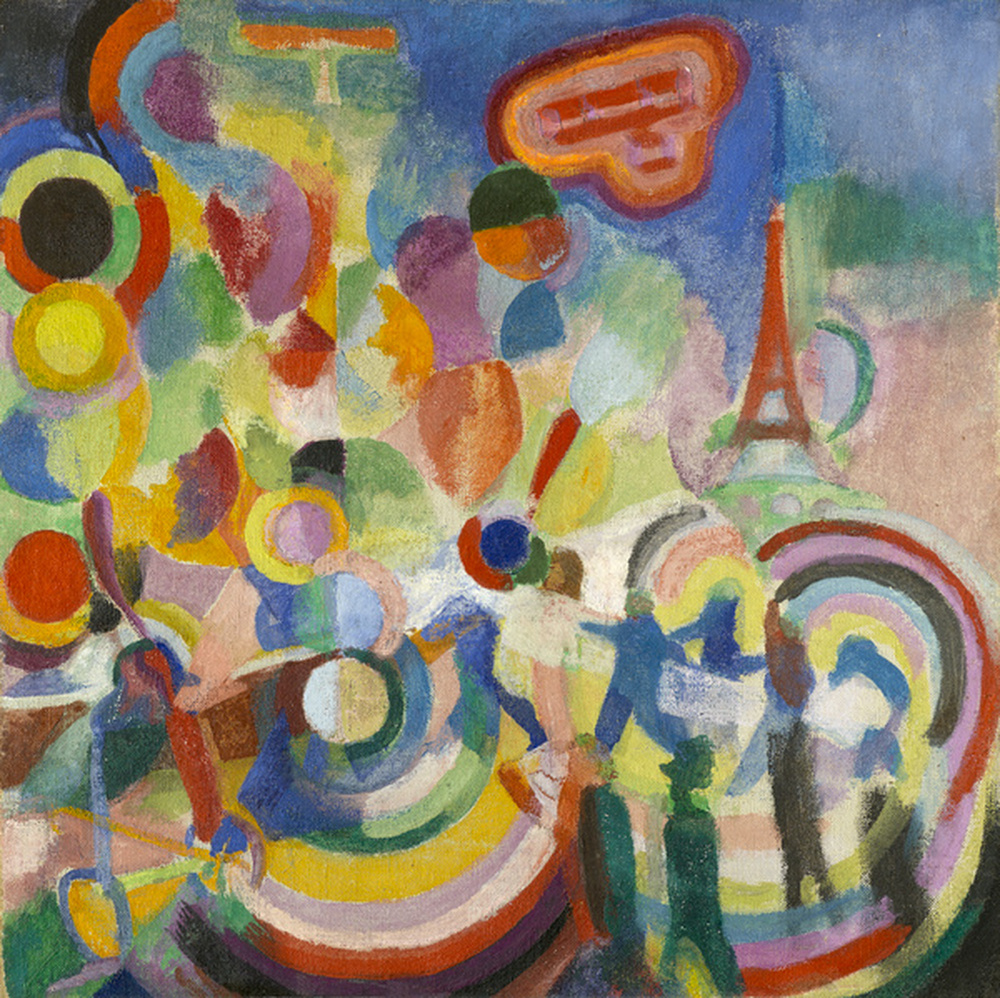
Robert Delaunay, 1914, Homage to Blériot, oil on canvas, Museum of Grenoble

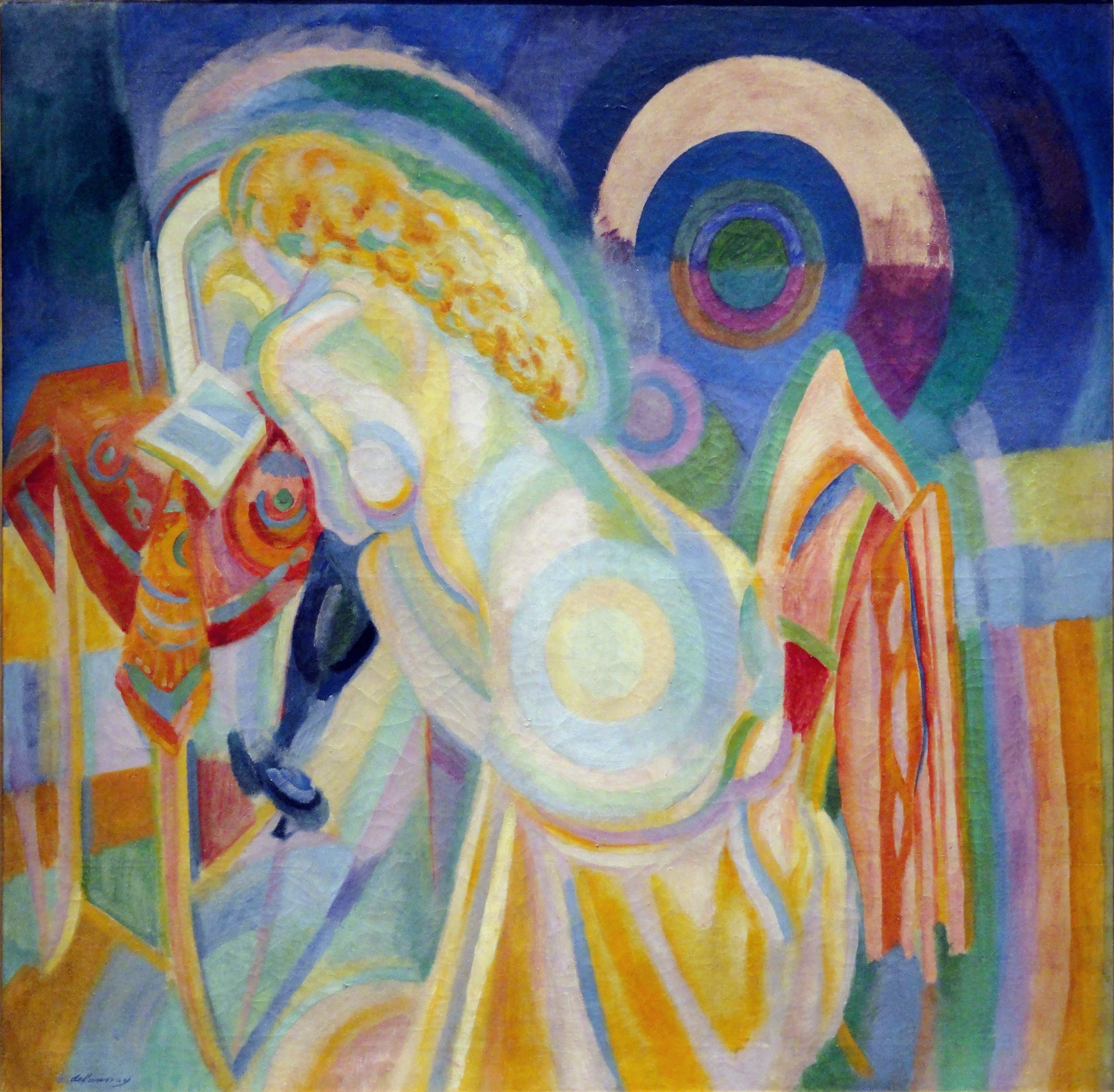
Robert Delaunay, 1915, Nu à la toilette (Nu à la coiffeuse), oil on canvas, 140 × 142 cm, Musée d'Art Moderne de la Ville de Paris

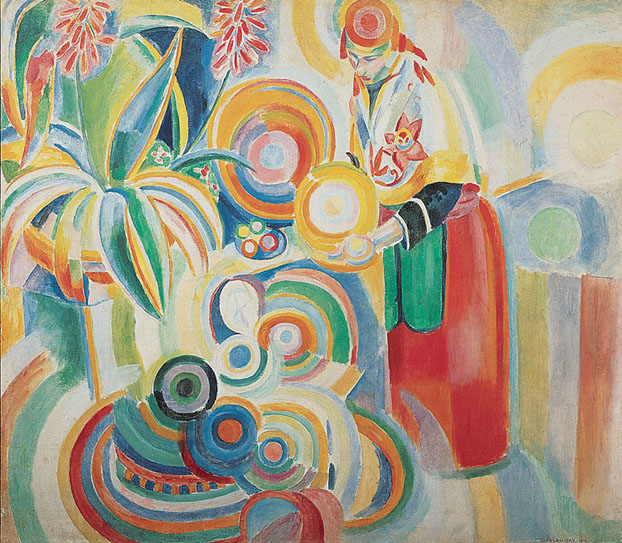
Robert Delaunay, 1916, Portuguese Woman, oil on canvas, 135.9 × 161 cm, Columbus Museum of Art

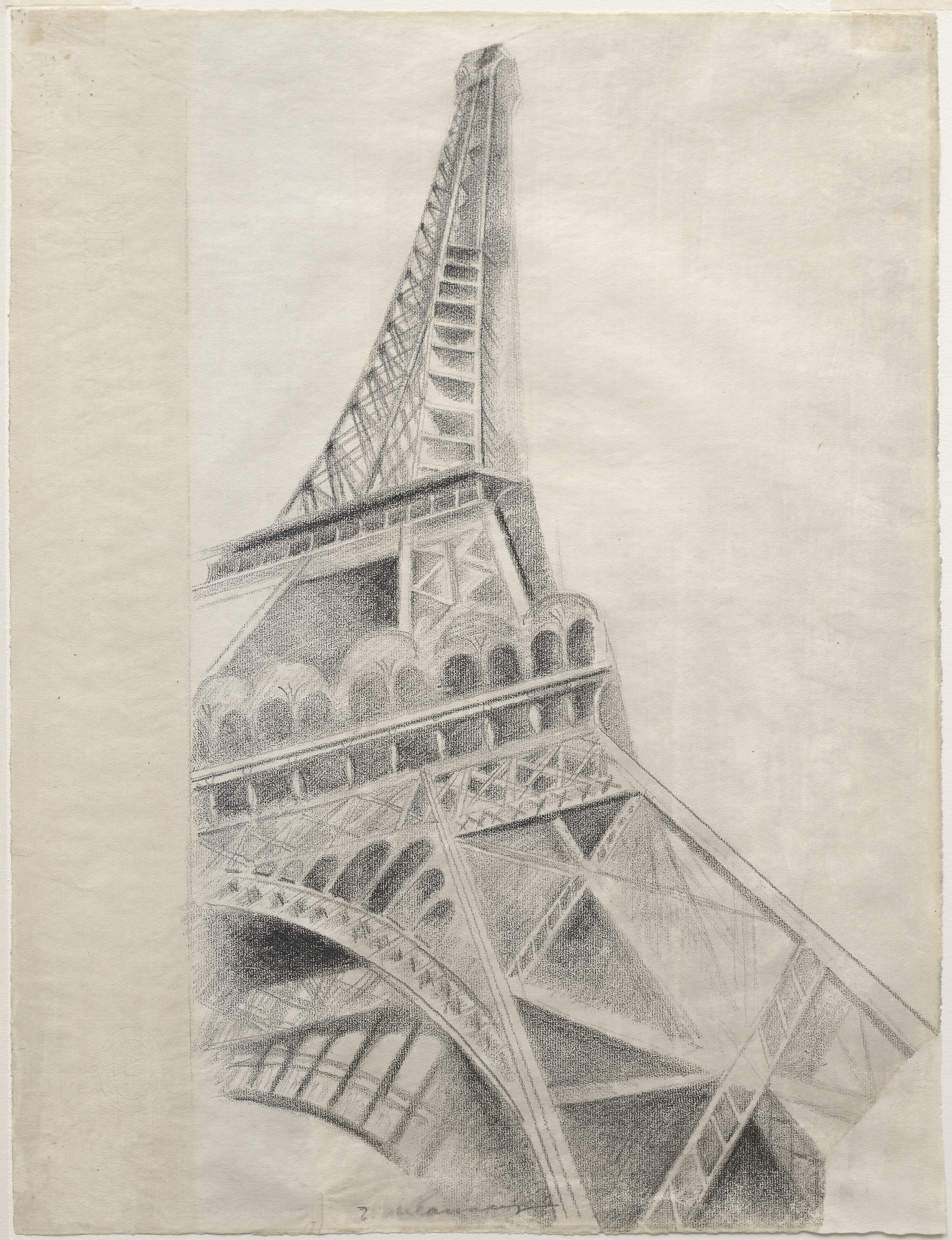
Robert Delaunay, 1926–1928, Eiffel Tower, Conté crayon on paper, 62.3 × 47.5 cm, Solomon R. Guggenheim Museum, New York, The Hilla Rebay Collection

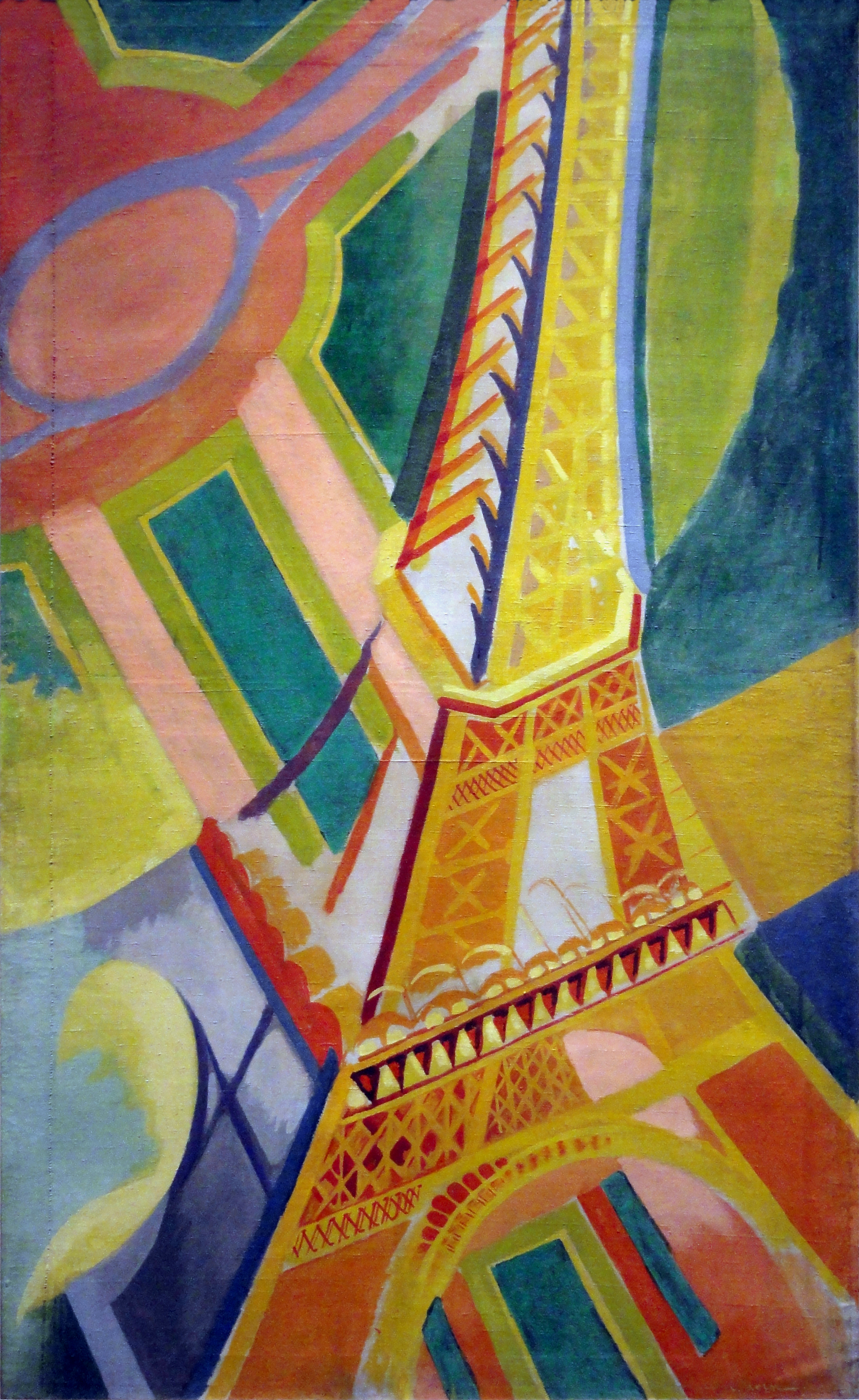
Robert Delaunay, 1926, Tour Eiffel, oil on canvas, 169 × 86 cm, Musée d'Art Moderne de la Ville de Paris

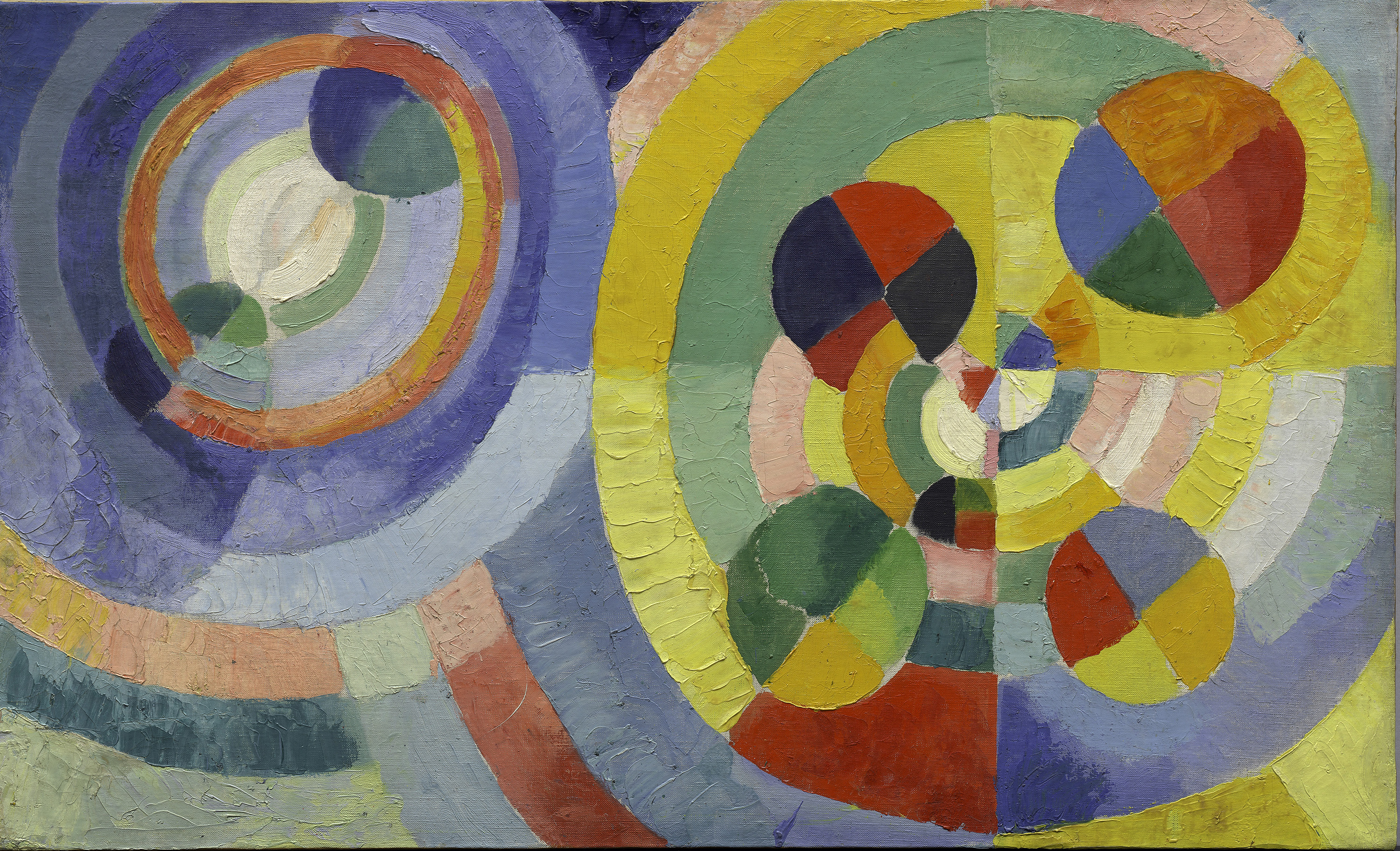
Robert Delaunay, 1930, Circular Forms, oil on canvas, 67.3 × 109.8 cm, Solomon R. Guggenheim Museum, New York, Gift by Andrew Powie Fuller and Geraldine Spreckels Fuller Collection, 1999

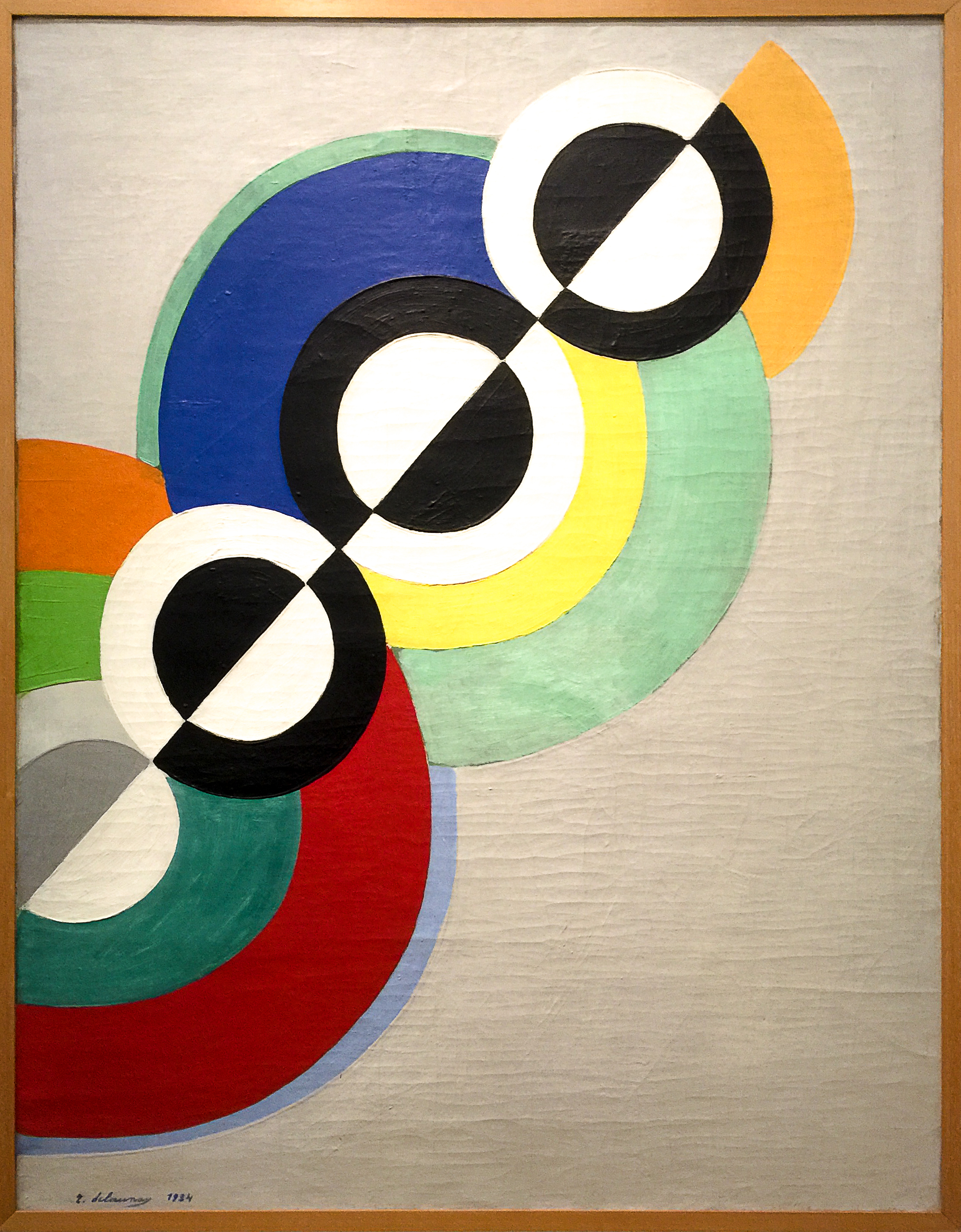
Rythme, 1934, oil on canvas, 145 x 113 cm, Centre Georges Pompidou

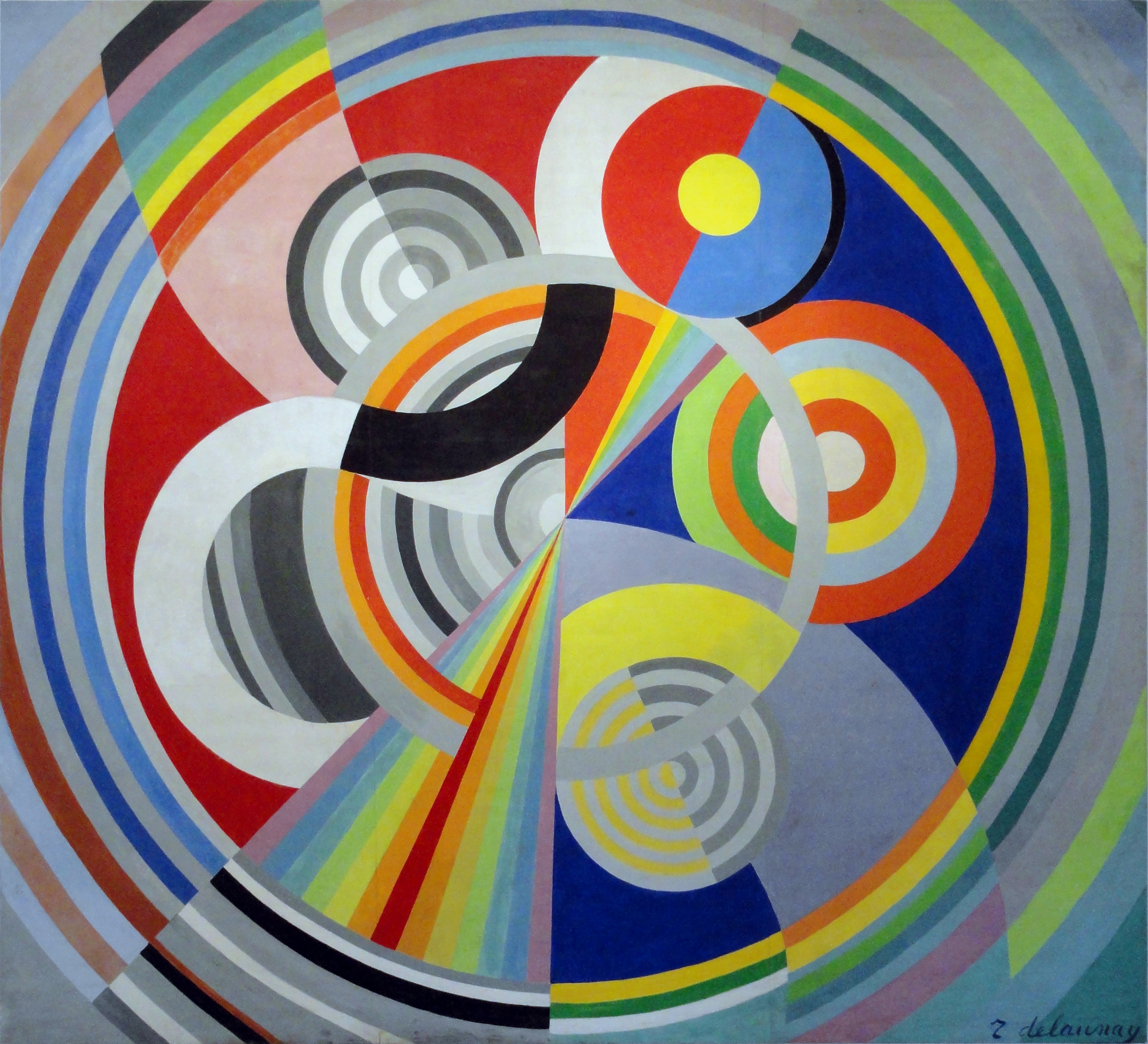
Robert Delaunay, 1938, Rythme n°1, Decoration for the Salon des Tuileries, oil on canvas, Musée d'Art Moderne de la Ville de Paris

== Museum collections ==
The main collection of Robert Delaunay's works is in the Musée National d'Art Moderne in Paris but his work also can be found in museums and public collections around the world such as the following:

=== Europe ===
The Musée National d'Art Moderne in Paris, the Musée d'Art Moderne de Paris, the Neue Nationalgalerie in Berlin, the Bilbao Fine Arts Museum (Spain), Kunstmuseum Basel (Switzerland), the National Galleries of Scotland, the New Art Gallery (Walsall, England), Palazzo Cavour (Turin, Italy), the Peggy Guggenheim Collection (Venice), National Museum of Serbia, Van Abbemuseum (Eindhoven, The Netherlands), Palais des Beaux-Arts de Lille (France). Tate (London, England)

=== United States ===
The Albright-Knox Art Gallery (Buffalo, New York), the Art Institute of Chicago, the Columbus Museum of Art, the Berkeley Art Museum, the Minneapolis Institute of Arts, the Fine Arts Museums of San Francisco, the Frances Lehman Loeb Art Center at Vassar College (Poughkeepsie, New York), the Guggenheim Museum (New York City), the Honolulu Museum of Art, the Museum of Modern Art (New York City), the National Gallery of Art (Washington, D.C.), the Dallas Museum of Art (Dallas, TX), the San Diego Museum of Art, the Philadelphia Museum of Art, and the Saint Louis Art Museum (Saint Louis, MO)

=== Elsewhere ===
The National Gallery of Victoria (Australia), the Aichi Prefectural Museum of Art (Japan).

=== Publications ===
- Baron, Stanley; Damase, Jacques (1995). Sonia Delaunay: The Life of an Artist. Harry N. Abrahams. ISBN 0-8109-3222-9.
- Düchting, Hajo (1995). Delaunay. Taschen. ISBN 3-8228-9191-6.
- Robert Delaunay – Sonia Delaunay: Das Centre Pompidou zu Gast in Hamburg. Hamburger Kunsthalle. 1999. ISBN 9783770152162.
- Gordon Hughes (1997). Envisioning Abstraction: The Simultaneity Of Robert Delaunay's First Disk.

== See also ==
- Abstraction Creation
