= Werner Merzbacher =

Swiss-American businessman (1928–2024)

- Born: Werner Merzbacher; June 11, 1928; Öhringen, Württemberg, Germany
- Died: October 5, 2024 (aged 96)
- Education: Commercial College, Zurich
- Occupations: Businessman; fur trader; art collector
- Spouse: Gabrielle Mayer (m. 1951)
- Children: 1

Werner Merzbacher (June 11, 1928 – October 5, 2024) was a Swiss-American businessman, fur trader and art collector of German origin.

== Early life and origin ==
Werner Merzbacher was born June 11, 1928, the second of two children, to Julius Merzbacher (1890–1943) and Hilde Merzbacher (née Haymann; 1898–1943), into a Jewish family. He had an older brother, Rolf Merzbacher (1924–1983). They were raised in Öhringen, Baden-Württemberg.

== Nazi era ==
When the Nazis came to power in Germany in 1933, Jewish families were persecuted under Hitler's anti-semitic laws. Merzbacher's father, a World War I veteran and recipient of the Knight's Cross of the Friedrich Order, was initially allowed to continue his medical practice before it was shut down by the Nazis. At the end of 1937, the father was sentenced to two months in jail in Heilbronn, and Rolf and Werner were placed with their grandparents Ida and Jakob Haymann in Konstanz. The parents gave up their medical practice in Öhringen and moved to Konstanz, where Julius Merzbacher was arrested after the Nazis Kristallnacht Pogrom against the Jews in 1938 and held for a month in the Dachau concentration camp.

In Konstanz, the parents tried to gather the necessary documents to emigrate to the United States. However, they failed to obtain them in time. In 1940 after conquering Alsace-Lorraine and the Reichsgau Baden, the Nazis deported the Jews living there to the Camp de Gurs in southern France in the Wagner-Bürckel action on October 22, 1940. Merzbacher's parents and grandmother from Konstanz were deported. His mother's siblings managed to escape via Switzerland. Merzbacher's parents were transferred to Camp de Rivesaltes in September 1942 and to the Drancy collection camp in October 1942, and from there to the Majdanek concentration camp with the 51st transport on March 6, 1943, where they were murdered in the Holocaust. From then on, no trace of them was found, and their death was later officially recorded on March 31, 1943.

Merzbacher arrived in Switzerland when he was ten years old on a Kindertransport.

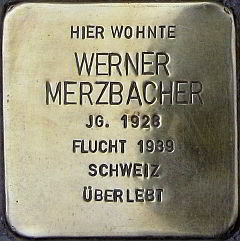
Stolperstein in Konstanz

Rolf Merzbacher attended elementary school in the neighboring Swiss town of Kreuzlingen from 1937 and was placed with a Swiss family there. Werner Merzbacher was allowed to enter Switzerland with a group of Jewish children on February 16, 1939, and was given a Christian upbringing by two ladies in Zurich. He got a scholarship for secondary school, worked as an extra and chair setter at the Schauspielhaus Zurich and dreamed of a career as a film director. From 1939 he attended commercial school.

Since Switzerland refused Werner Merzbacher and his ill brother naturalization even after the end of the war, he emigrated to the US in 1949. He married Gabrielle Mayer in 1951 and, after completing his military service in Alaska, worked in the leather hide trade. He soon moved into the fur trade, where he discovered his talent for financial transactions. He joined the firm of Max Pick, a well-known New York fur trader in the industry, as a partner. After Max Pick's death, he became a partner in the Swiss company Mayer & Cie. In 1964, the couple moved to Zurich with their three children. In the economic upswing of the post-war years, Mayer & Cie. advanced to become one of the leading names in the international fur business, largely thanks to the efforts of Werner Merzbacher. In 1989 he became the sole owner of the company. Werner Merzbacher is the son-in-law of Ernst Mayer, the son of the company founder.

In Öhringen, a street was named after his father in 1991, and Merzbacher visited his hometown to mark the occasion - after there had previously been controversial debates in the municipal council on the occasion of the naming. In 2011, stolpersteine were laid at Schottenstrasse 75 in Constance commemorating members of the Haymann and Merzbacher families.

=== Art collector ===
In the 1960s, Werner Merzbacher and Gabrielle Merzbacher-Mayer began to build up an art collection. In addition to acquisitions, three paintings came from the inheritance of the fur merchant Bernhard Mayer (1866–1946), Gabrielle Mayer's grandfather, who had fled to the US in 1941 to escape the German persecution of the Jews. Bernhard Mayer had begun collecting contemporary art in the 1920s.

Merzbacher was also active on an honorary basis in the Collections Commission of the Kunsthaus Zürich and on the board of the Association of Zurich Friends of Art. In 1986, the couple donated the "Dr. Julius and Hilde Merzbacher Gallery for Israeli Art" to the Israel Museum in Jerusalem. Since the opening of the Kunsthaus Zürich extension, 65 paintings from the collection have been shown there for twenty years.

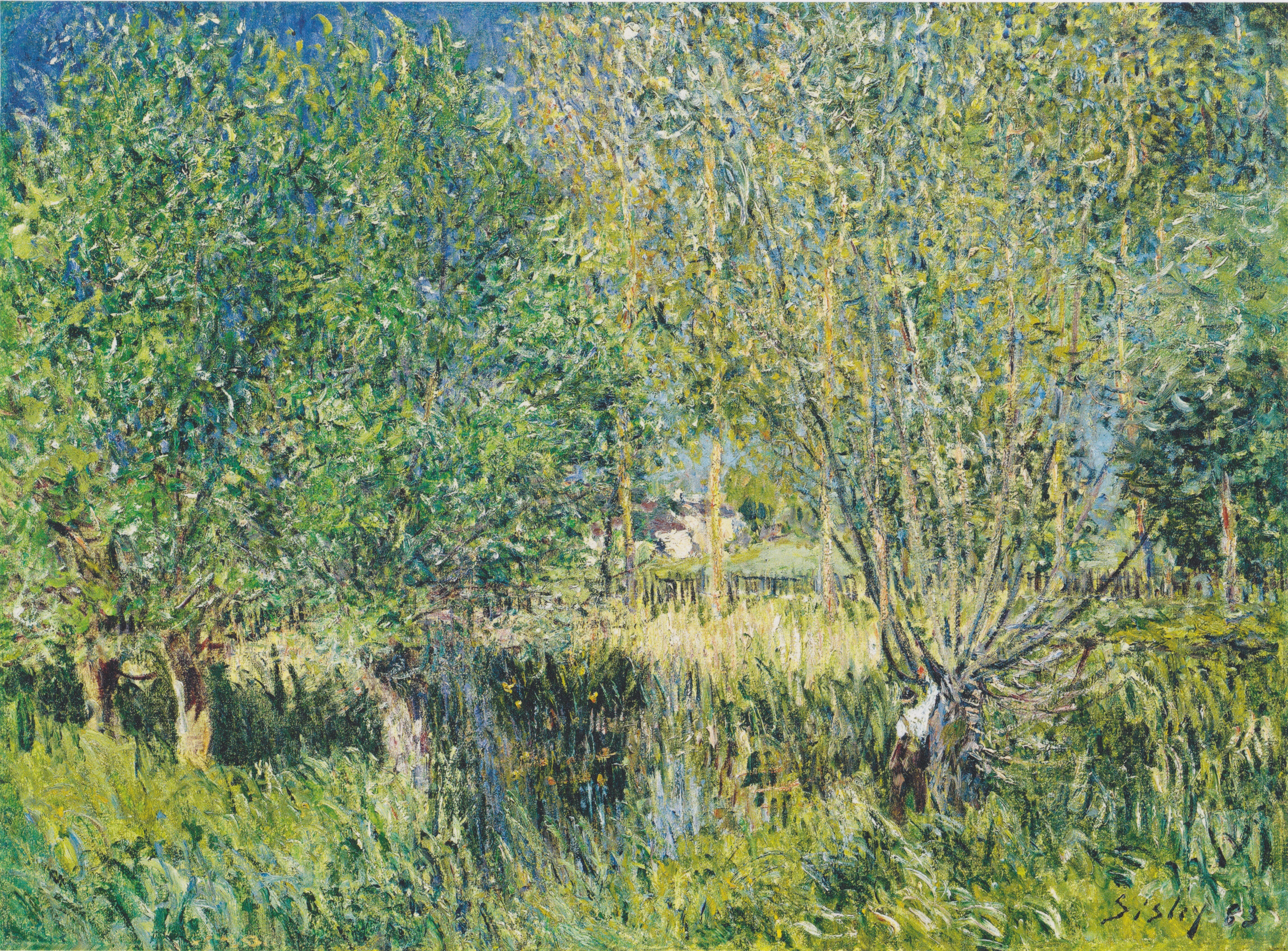
Alfred Sisley: Weiden am Ufer der Orvanne

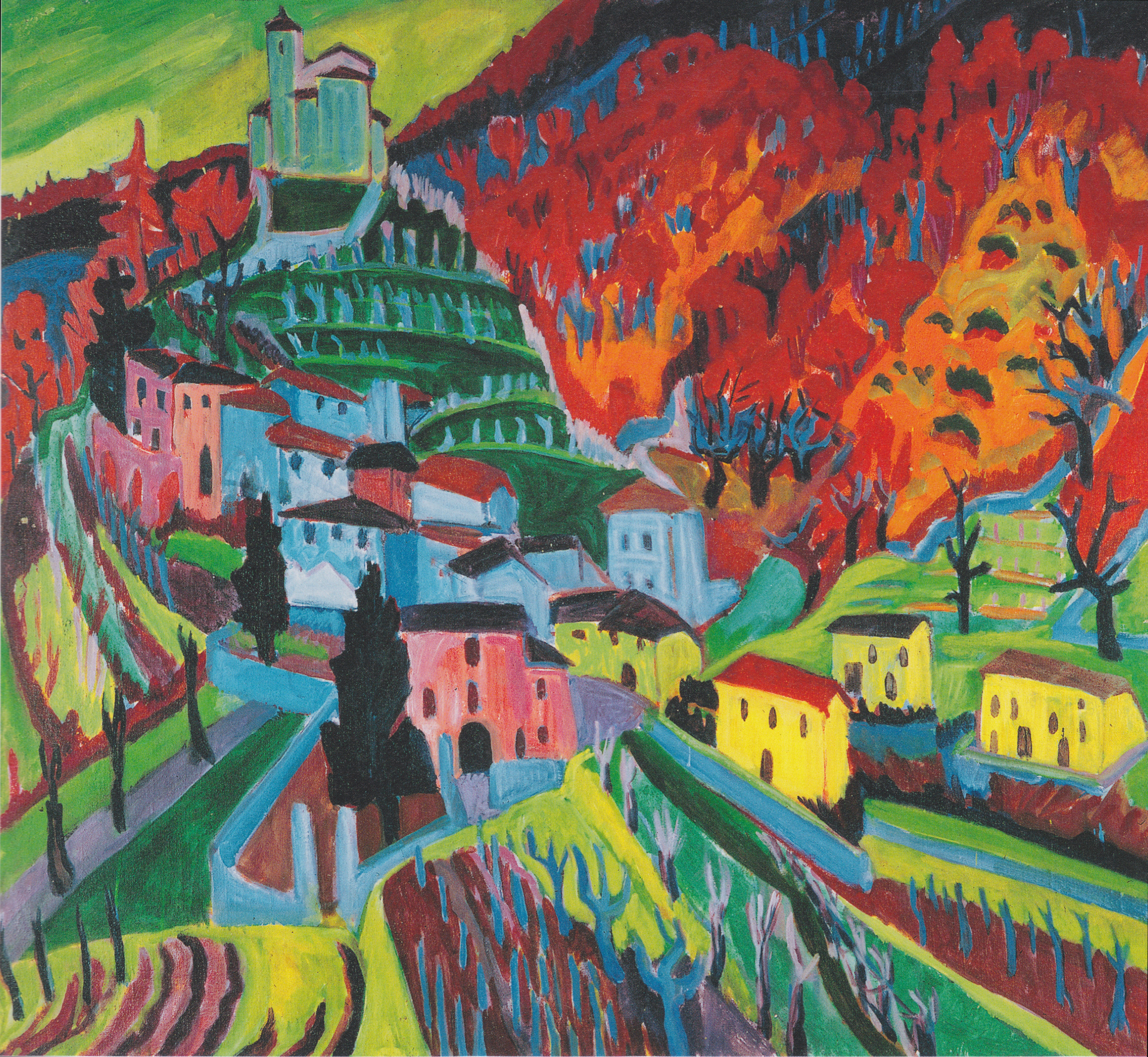
Hermann Scherer: Mendrisiotto mit Kirche von Obino

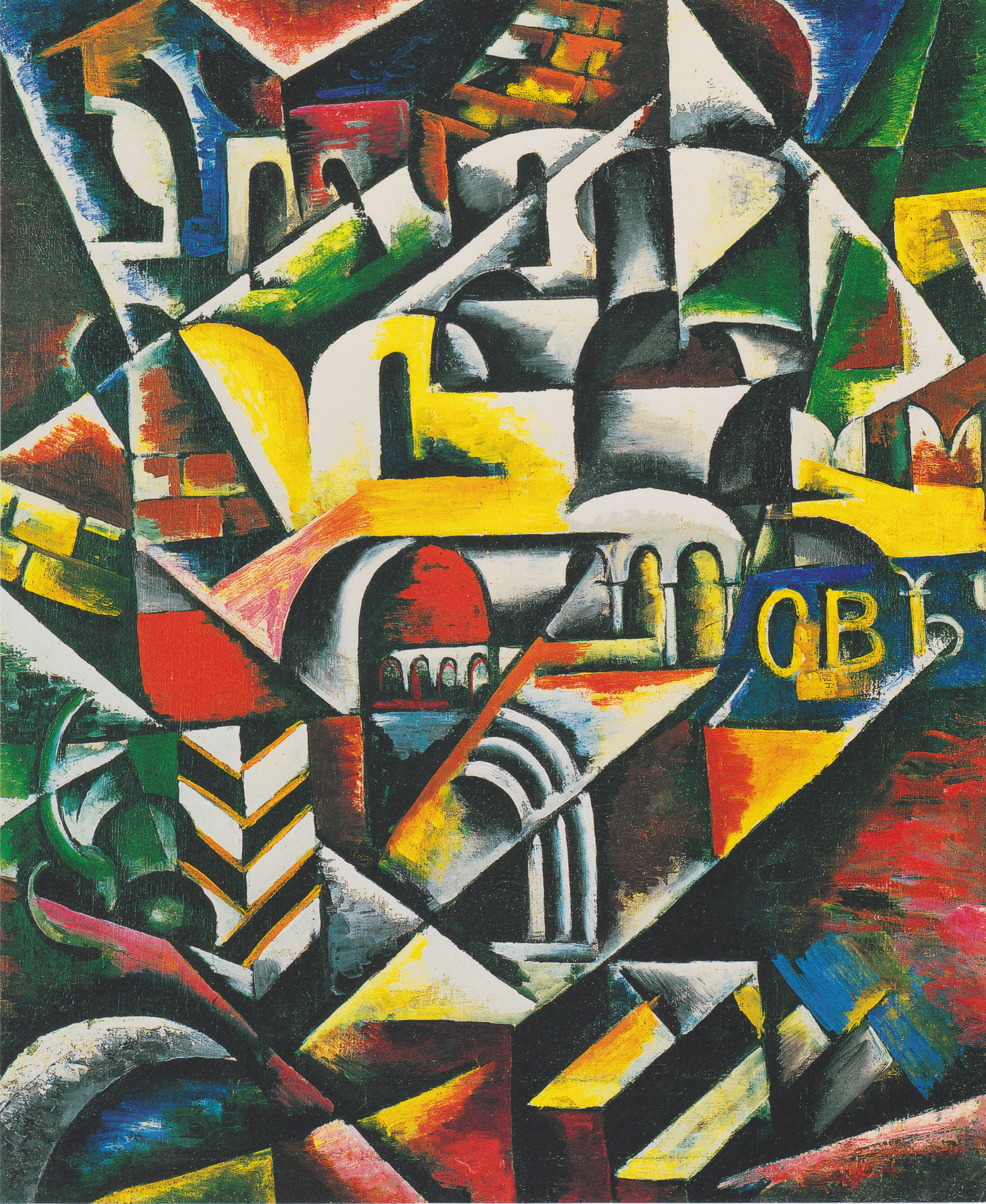
Ljubow Popowa: Kubistische Stadtlandschaft

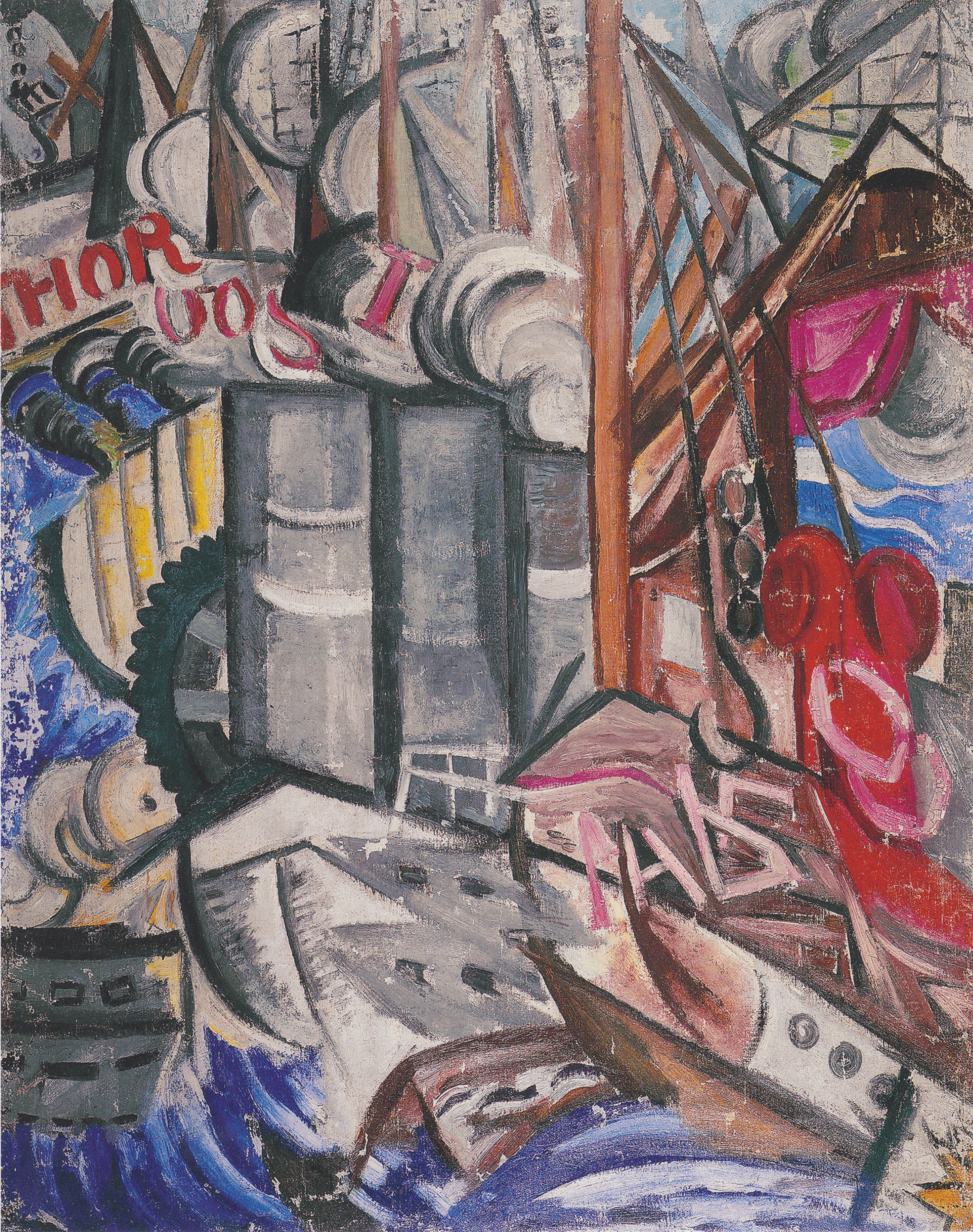
Olga Rozanova: Der Hafen

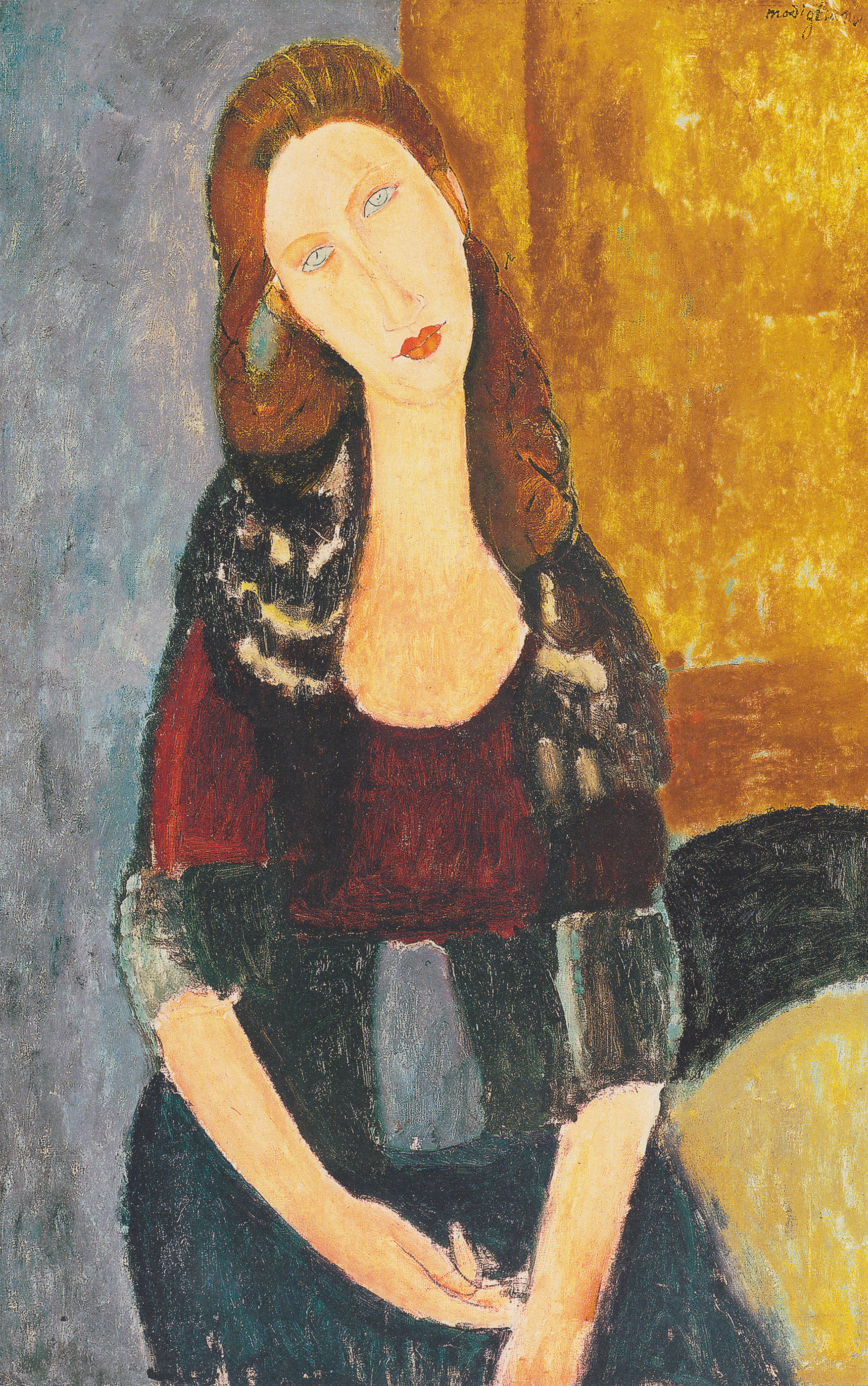
Amedeo Modigliani: Jeanne Hebuterne

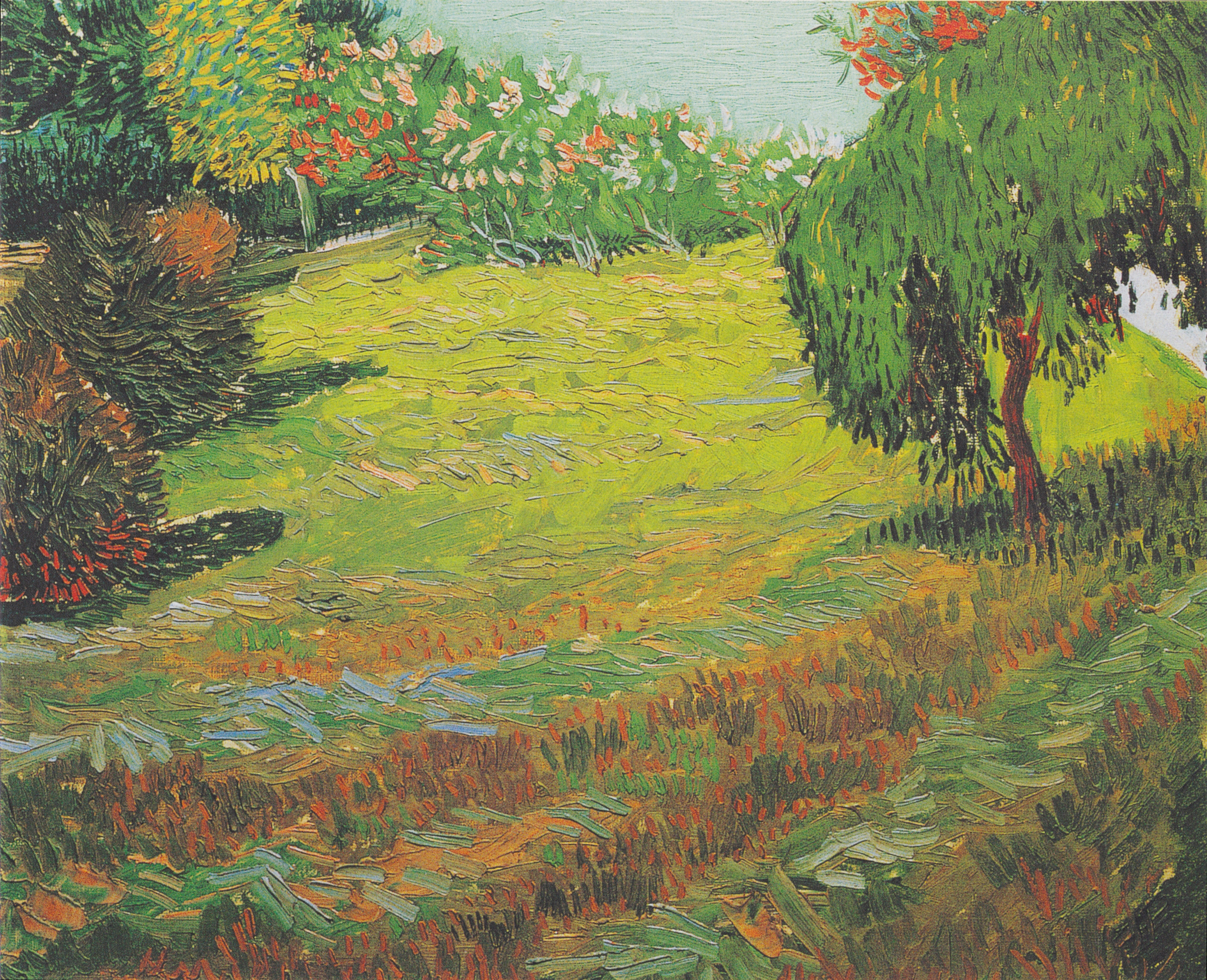
Vincent von Gogh: Garten mit Trauerweide

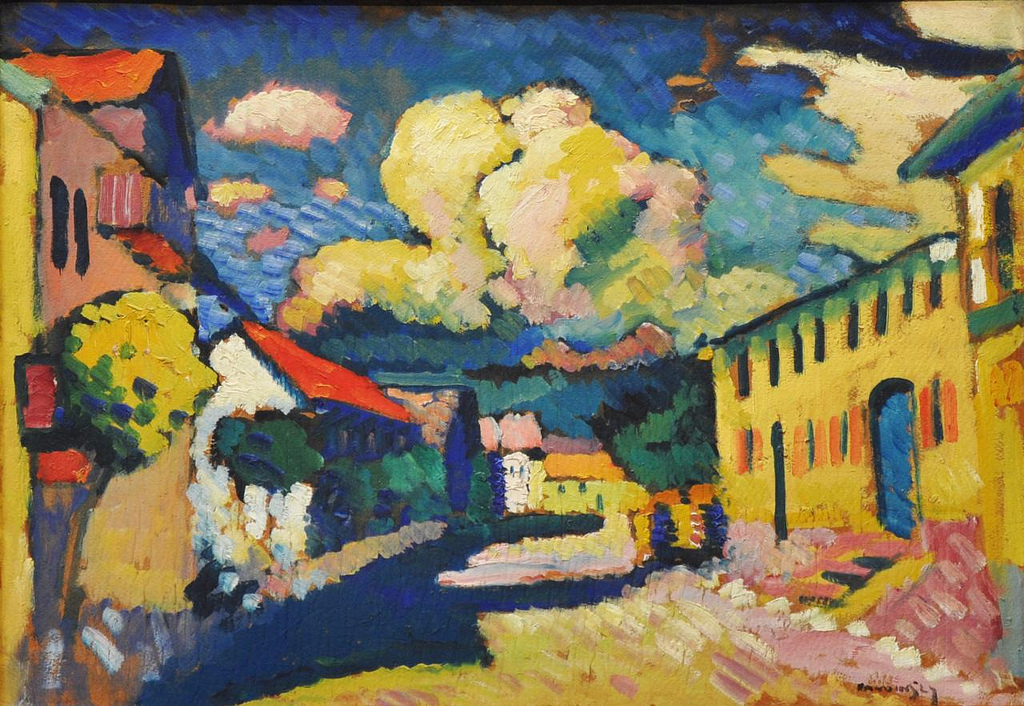
Vassily Kandinsky: Dorfstrasse in Murnau (1908)

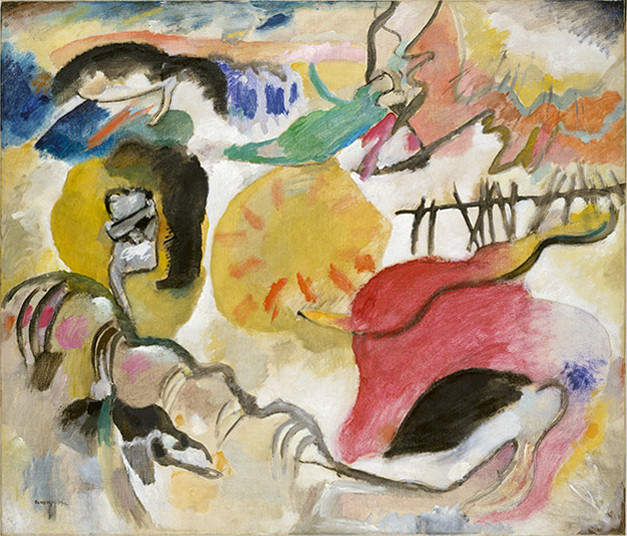
Vassily Kandinsky: Improvisation 27, Liebesgarten II (1912)

The Werner and Gabrielle Merzbacher Collection contains far more than 100 works, including works by Max Beckmann, Umberto Boccioni, Georges Braque, Alexander Calder, Paul Cézanne, Sonja Delaunay-Terk, André Derain, Alexandra Exter, Sam Francis, Vincent van Gogh, Natalia Gontscharowa, Alexej von Jawlensky, Wassily Kandinsky, Ernst Ludwig Kirchner, Paul Klee, František Kupka, Fernand Léger, Kasimir Malewitsch, Henri Matisse, Gabriele Münter, Ernst Wilhelm Nay, Pablo Picasso, Emil Nolde, Ljubow Popova, Olga Rozanova, Maurice de Vlaminck.

Gabrielle and Werner Merzbacher first publicly showed images from their collection in 1999, on the occasion of the fiftieth anniversary of the State of Israel at the Jerusalem Israel Museum, under the title "The joy of color". The collection was presented in four Japanese cities in 2001, at the Royal Academy of Arts in London in 2002 under the title Masters of Colour, at the Kunsthaus Zürich in 2006 under the title Fest der Farbe, and in 2012 under the title "le mythe de la couleur" by the Fondation Pierre Gianadda in Martigny. In 2013, the Merzbachers went to Israel again with a selection of their Fauvists.

== Personal life and death ==
From 1951, Merzbacher was married to Gabrielle Mayer, granddaughter of Bernhard Mayer. They had three children.

Merzbacher died on October 5, 2024, at the age of 96.

== Exhibition catalogs (selection) ==
- Stephanie Rachum; Ziva Amishai-Maisels (Hrsg.): The joy of color: the Merzbacher collection. Köln : DuMont; Jerusalem : Israel Museum, 1998.
- Tobia Bezzola; Linda Schädler (Hrsg.): Fest der Farbe. Die Sammlung Merzbacher-Mayer. Dumont, Köln 2006, ISBN 3-8321-7683-7.
- Stephanie Rachum; John Gage (Hrsg.): Masters of Colour: Derain to Kandinsky; masterpieces from The Merzbacher Collection. Royal Academy of Arts, London 2002.
- Jean-Louis Prat (Hrsg.): Van Gogh, Picasso, Kandinsky: collection Merzbacher, le mythe de la couleur. Fondation Pierre Gianadda, Martigny 2012. dossier de presse

== Literature ==
- Gregor Spuhler: Gerettet – zerbrochen. Das Leben des jüdischen Flüchtlings Rolf Merzbacher zwischen Verfolgung, Psychiatrie und Wiedergutmachung. Chronos, Zürich 2011, ISBN 978-3-0340-1064-1 (Veröffentlichungen des Archivs für Zeitgeschichte ETH Zürich. Band 7).
- Ein Öhringer Schicksal. Das Lebensbild des Öhringer Arztes Dr. Julius Merzbacher. Stadt Öhringen, Öhringen 1991.
