= The Yellow Scale =

Painting by František Kupka

- Žlutá stupnice (Czech)
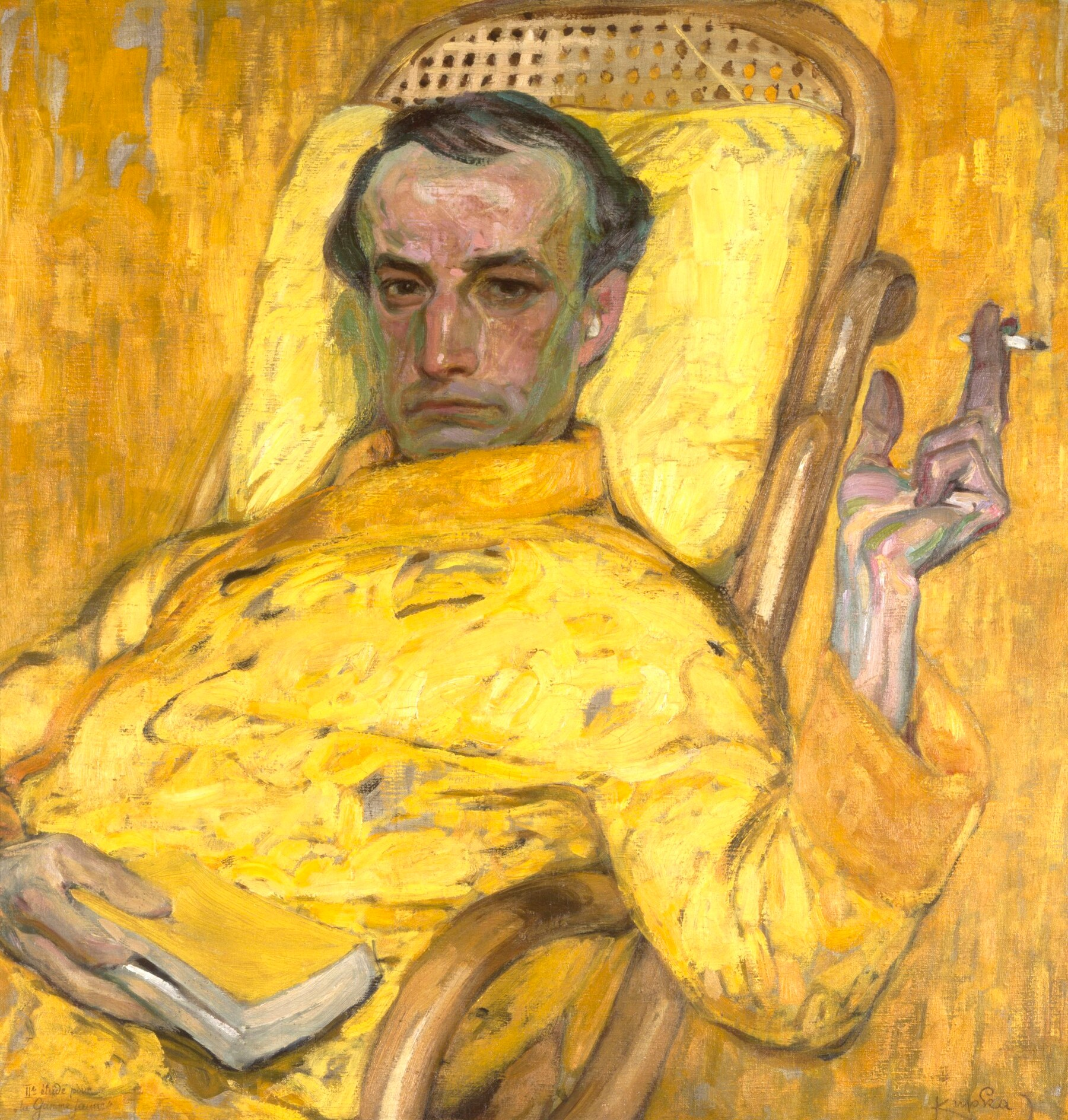
- The Yellow Scale as displayed at the Museum of Fine Arts, Houston.
- Artist: František Kupka
- Year: c. 1907, perhaps continuing until c. 1908
- Medium: Oil on canvas
- Subject: Himself
- Dimensions: 78.74 cm × 74.30 cm (31.00 in × 29.25 in)
- Location: Museum of Fine Arts; Houston

The Yellow Scale (Czech: Žlutá stupnice) is a large oil-on-canvas self-portrait painting by František Kupka created in 1907. It is owned by the Museum of Fine Arts, Houston.

Measuring at approximately 0.8 m × 0.75 m, it encapsulates a spectrum of yellow tones, from warm cadmiums to bright lemon yellows, contrasting with Kupka’s dark stare. Kupka is at the centre of the composition, bathed in yellow light and holding a cigarette in one hand and a book in the other. His figure is, alongside the yellow tones, the focal point of the piece that explores traditional color theory. Visually, the bright yellow tones dominate the composition, struck through by the pinks and purples of Kupka’s form, creating an exploration of colour.

The painting has been used to portray Jean des Esseintes, protagonist of the novel À rebours (1884), written by Joris-Karl Huysmans, in the Penguin Classics prints of the book.

== Description and context ==
Kupka had shown a strong interest in traditional color theory, with Margit Rowell descring the painting as "Kupka's first attempt to come to terms with color theory in which the result is both personal and successful". Although a self-portrait, the subject of the painting was the color yellow.

The painting is rooted in the realm of realism, lifted by its edge of the abstract in Kupka’s simplification of form and structure alongside the dramatic use of colour. The work favours atmosphere and tone over the rigidity of realist ideals, yet still retains much of the core features of realism through the coherency and technical prowess the piece showcases.

It has been proposed that a daguerreotype photograph of Charles Baudelaire by Nadar influenced the painting, and in at least one analysis––from Sabine Doran's book The Culture of Yellow: or The Visual Politics of Late Modernity––the picture is treated as a portrait of Baudelaire, rather than a self-portrait: "Kupka mixes a realistic portrait of the poet with an abstraction in monochrome yellow, saturating, as it were, with the narrative of decline that encapsulates the artist, his psychological and physiological state, as well as his work (the yellow book)."
