= Jindřich Waldes =

Czech industrialist

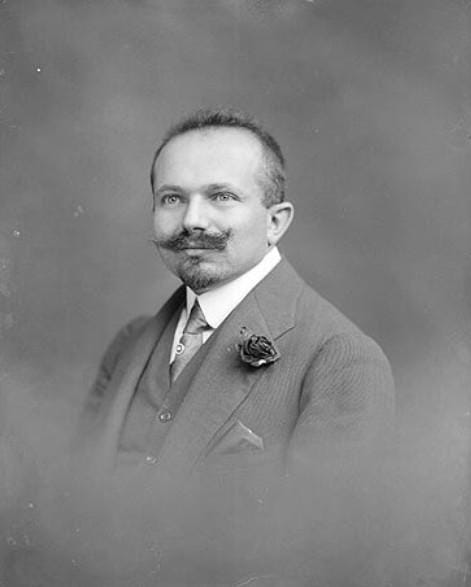
- Waldes in 1912
- Born: 2 July 1876; Nemyšl, Bohemia, Austria-Hungary
- Died: 1 July 1941 (aged 64); Havana, Cuba
- Other names: Heinrich Waldes; Henry Waldes
- Occupation: Industrialist

Jindřich Waldes (also Heinrich Waldes or Henry Waldes; 2 July 1876 – 1 July 1941) was a Czech industrialist, philanthropist and art collector. He was the founder of the Waldes Koh-i-noor Company, which produces textile haberdashery.

== Life ==
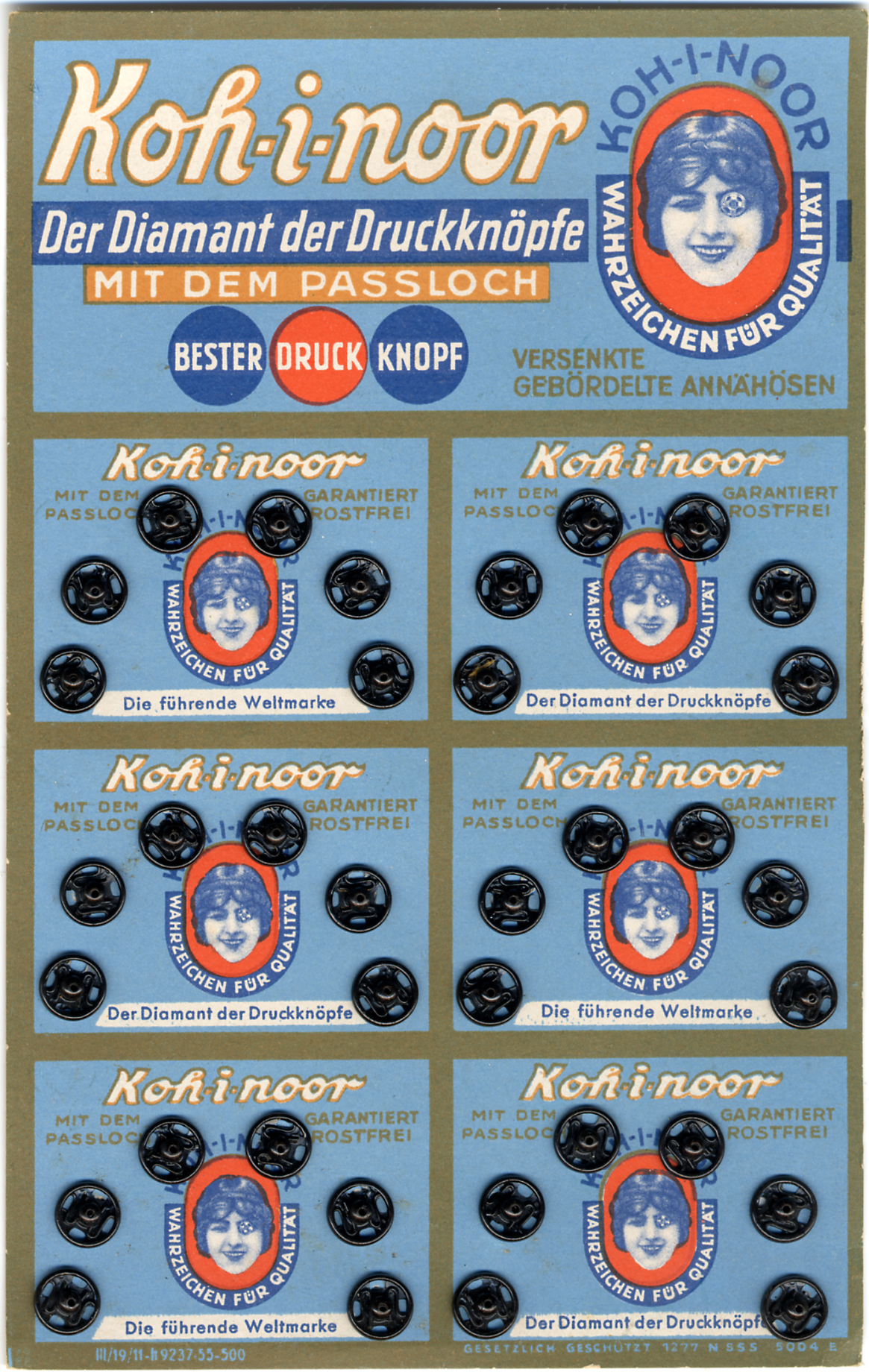
Waldes Koh-i-noor fasteners for the German market, 1920s

Karel Waldes, father of Jindřich, had an inn and a small haberdashery shop in the village of Nemyšl near the town of Tábor in southern Bohemia. He wanted his son to continue his business but Jindřich found a position of a clerk at the firm of Eduard Lokesch and Son in Prague. This company made buttons and cufflinks. As Waldes had a good knowledge of languages he became Lokesch's business agent and travelled the world on behalf of the firm.

In 1902 together with an engineer Hynek Puc (1856–1938) Waldes left Lokesch and founded his own company. A year later Puc invented a special machine that inserted a small spring into concealed dress fasteners, the main product of the new firm. The new machine supplemented labour of ten skilled workers. With the increased production Puc kept inventing more machines to support the manufacture of pins, safety pins, needles and buttons. The world-renowned Waldes trademark, Miss KIN, came about in 1912 when Waldes on his ocean trip met Elizabeth Coyne who playfully put one fastener in her eye. František Kupka painted her portrait in oils and Vojtěch Preissig from it designed the firm's trademark. The other trade names used were Koh-i-noor and Otello.

Waldes Koh-i-noor headquarters were located in Prague suburbs of Vršovice. Soon the company grew to a large concern with branch factories in Warsaw, Dresden, Vienna, Paris, Barcelona and New York City.

== Nazi-era ==
After Hitler invaded in 1939, the Waldes, who were Jewish, lost everything. On 1 September 1939 Waldes was imprisoned by Gestapo after the Third Reich occupation of Czechoslovakia and kept in concentration camps Dachau and Buchenwald, arriving in Dachau on 10 September 1939, and transferred to Buchenwald on September 26 of the same year. In 1941 his family, who were sent to the United States by Waldes before the war (he decided to remain in Prague as a Czech patriot) paid the Nazi authorities 8 million Czech crowns (about 1 Million Reichsmarks or $250,000 US) ransom. In Buchenwald he suffered a diabetic attack, and was in the prison hospital from 11 April 1940 until his release on 2 June 1941. The Gestapo then transported Waldes by plane to Lisbon, Portugal, where he boarded a United States-bound ship. However, Waldes did not survive the journey to the United States and died under suspicious circumstances on the ship which stopped at Havana, Cuba in May 1941.

"He [Waldes] arrived on a Portuguese ship in Cuba. In the moment that he stepped onto solid ground, he broke down and died."

According to Aufbau Magazine, Waldes died in a hospital in Havana. He was cremated at a memorial attended by several hundred people on 15 July 1941 at Fresh Pond, Maspeth, in New York.

Other reports say that Jindřich and his family perished in the Buchenwald concentration camp.

== Art collection ==
Waldes was also a passionate art collector of contemporary Czech art. In 1918 in Prague he founded Waldes Museum for his collection of buttons which had over 70 thousand items. The collection was transferred after the World War II to Museum of Decorative Arts in Prague. Apart from buttons he collected works of Czech painters especially František Kupka's paintings. They became friends in 1919 and remained so until 1938. Waldes supported Kupka throughout his career by buying his canvases. Part of Jindřich Waldes' collection held by the National Gallery in Prague had been returned to his descendants living in the United States.

== Restitution of looted property ==
After the war the factory was not restituted to the family, but instead taken by the state.

In 1999 it was announced that much of the stolen art collection would be restituted.

In 2007 the Prague City Court rendered the decision to return fifty percent of the Czech Koh-i-Noor holdings to the Waldes family heirs. However, in 2010 the Constitutional Court in Brno reversed the decision, stating that the Beneš decrees of 1945 handed the property to the Czech state, not the Communist seizures in 1948.

== See also ==
- List of claims for restitution for Nazi-looted art
- Aryanization
