= Bernhard Mayer =

German merchant and anarchist (1866–1946)

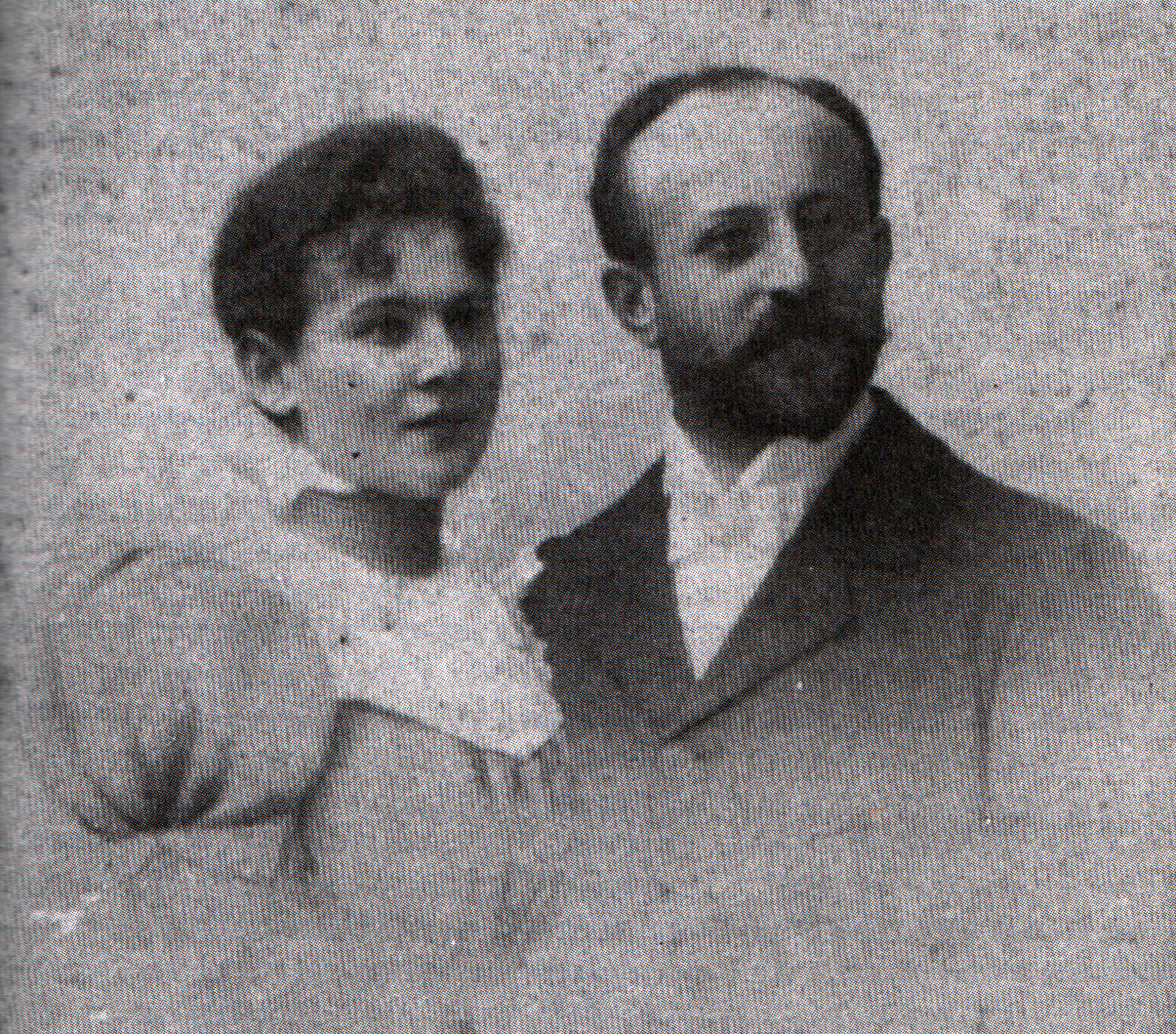
- Auguste and Bernhard Mayer, 1897
- Born: Bernhard Mayer; July 22, 1866; Laufersweiler, Grand Duchy of Baden, German Empire
- Died: July 18, 1946 (aged 79); Zürich, Switzerland
- Other name: Mink Bernardo
- Occupations: Fur trader, art collector
- Known for: Founding of Merzbacher Collection
- Children: 2

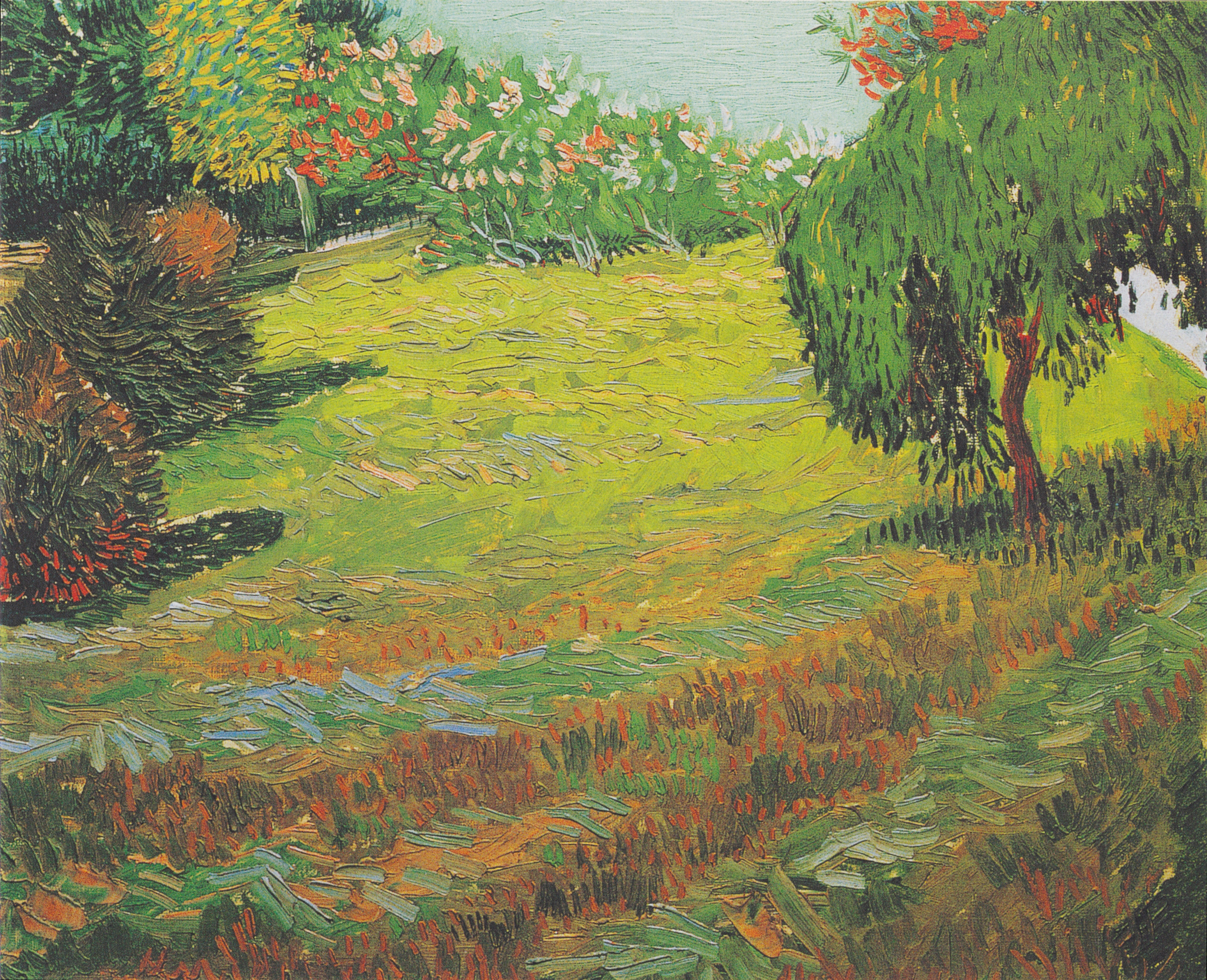
Vincent von Gogh: Garten mit Trauerweide, today in the Merzbacher Kunststiftung

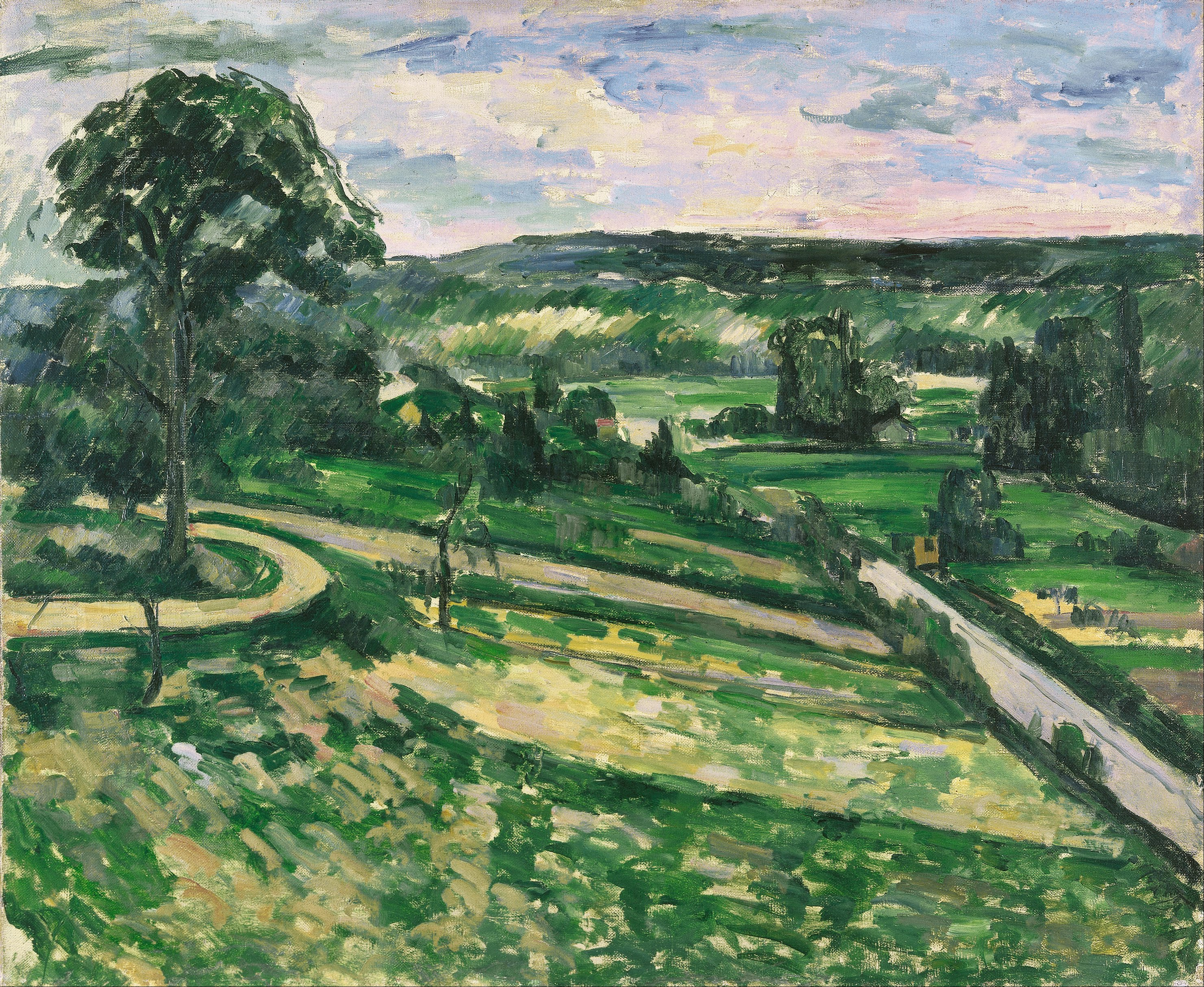
Paul Cézanne: Landschaft bei Ausver-sur-Oise (1881/82), today in the Israel-Museum, gift of Lilly Schwabacher-Mayer

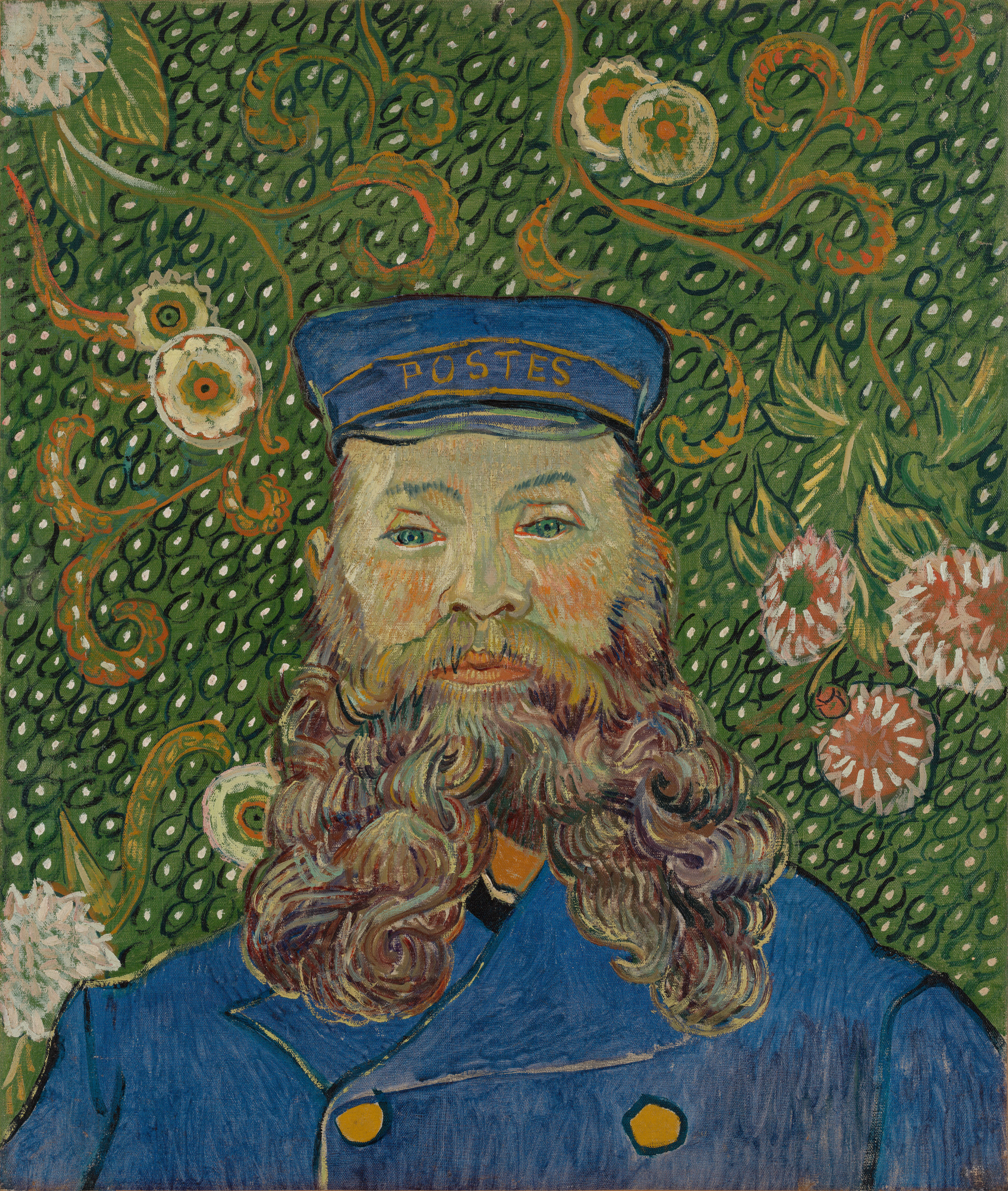
Vincent van Gogh: Portrait de Joseph Roulin (1889), today in the Moma

Bernhard Mayer (July 22, 1866 – July 18, 1946) was a German fur trader, anarchist, patron and art collector. He laid the foundation for the Merzbacher Collection which is currently housed at Kunsthaus Zürich.

== Early life and education ==
Bernhard Mayer came from a Jewish family from the Hunsrück region. His father ran a grocery store, his mother was a housewife. At the age of eleven, he left his parents to attend school in Bad Kreuznach. He broke off his education and worked first in Simmern, then Saarbrücken, Saargemünd and finally in 1885 in Aachen. He completed an apprenticeship as furrier in Brussels, Belgium.

== Career ==
In 1895 he started his business as fur trader and after initial difficulties his fur business flourished and he opened branches in Paris, Berlin, Zurich and Amsterdam, run by members of the family. The poet Else Lasker-Schüler jokingly called him Mink Bernardo.

== Art collector ==
In Brussels in 1903 he had bought two pictures from an outsider, James Ensor, as support; Guste and he thus laid the foundation for an unsystematically built up collection of pictures. The Munich art historian Franz Stadler encouraged him to buy pictures by French Impressionists, but only first-class works. In 1926, Mr. and Mrs. Mayer had the Teatro San Materno built for the dancer Charlotte Bara in Ascona. Mayer was also otherwise active as a patron and collector of art, acquiring paintings by Cézanne, van Gogh, Renoir, Matisse and Picasso, among others, primarily in the 1920s. In a hotel built especially for this purpose in Ascona, he hosted numerous writers and artists, especially emigrants, such as Holitscher, Ehrenstein, the Fritsch couple, Else Lasker-Schüler and many others. Famous first works, such as those of Ignazio Silone, were published only thanks to his financial guarantee. Where it was possible, he did it anonymously.

== Nazi persecution and emigration ==
In 1941, he fled from the National Socialists to the USA; he had already taken some of his pictures to safety there in 1936, while others were lost. In New York City in 1944, with Guste's help, he wrote his memoirs, which he dedicated to his four grandchildren. After the end of the war he returned with the paintings to his house in Ascona. Guste Mayer died there in 1958.

Part of his art collection found its place as inspiration, incentive and catalyst. in the Merzbacher Collection of his granddaughter Gabrielle Merzbacher-Mayer and her husband Werner Merzbacher.

== Personal life ==
Mayer supported socialism and anarchism. His connections with anarchists brought him to Ascona in 1909, where he built a home. At the beginning of World War I, Mayer, as a German, had to leave Belgium; he went to Berlin and in 1916 to Zurich, then to Ascona.

== Selected works ==
- Bernhard Mayer: Interessante Zeitgenossen. Lebenserinnerungen eines jüdischen Kaufmanns und Weltbürgers. Hrsg. von Erhard Roy Wiehn. Hartung-Gorre Verlag, Konstanz 1998 (Autobiographie und Beiträge, deutsch und engl.), ISBN 3-89191-888-7.

== Bibliography ==
- Rachum, Stephanie (2006). "A Tale of Two Collections: Bernhard and Auguste Mayer, Werner and Gabrielle Merzbacher". In Kunsthaus Zürich (ed.). Feast of Color: The Merzbacher-Mayer Collection. Cologne: DuMont. pp. 14–27. ISBN 978-3-8321-7687-7. OCLC 65166666.
