= Nemyšl =

- Municipality
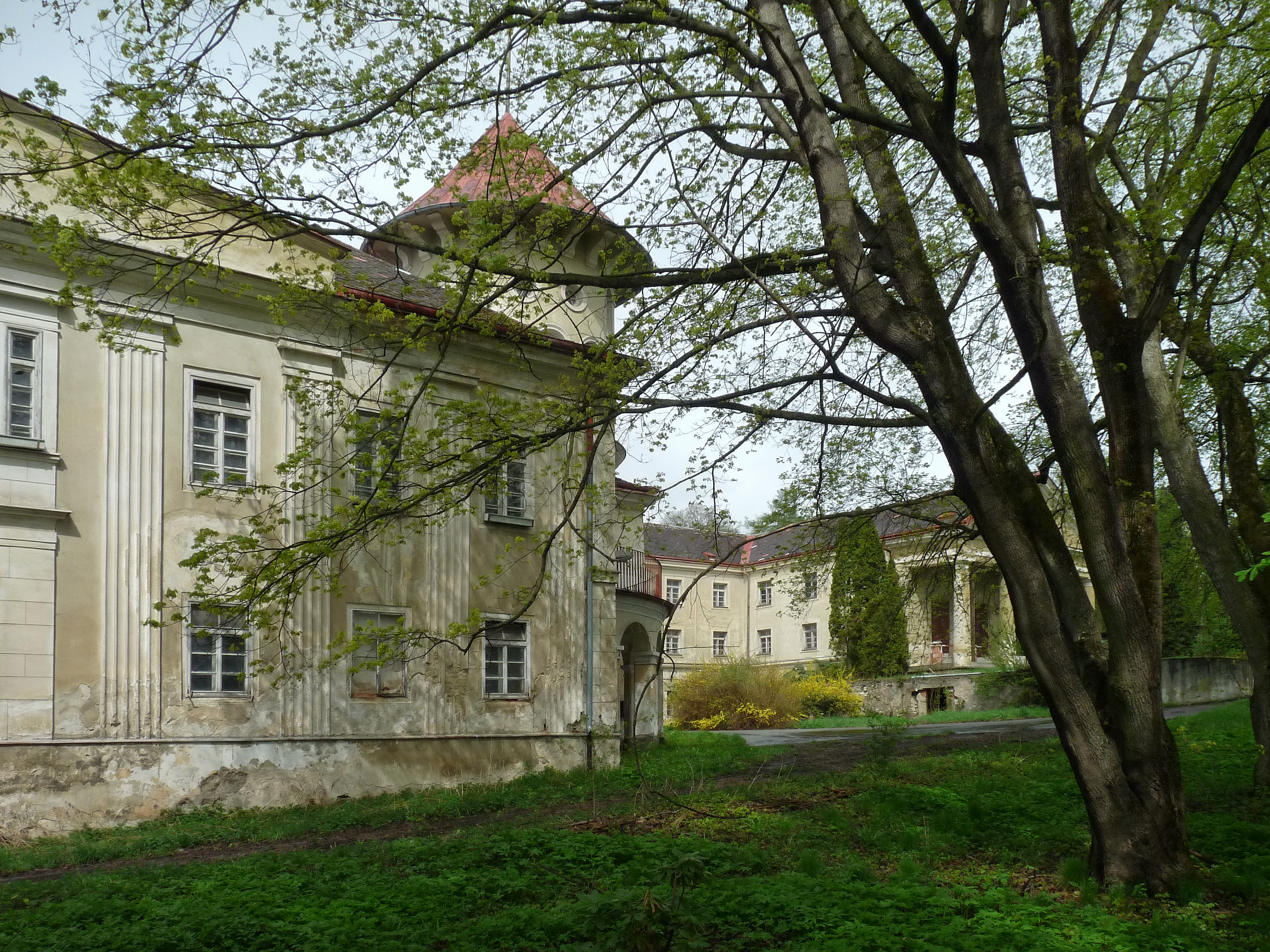
- Nemyšl Castle

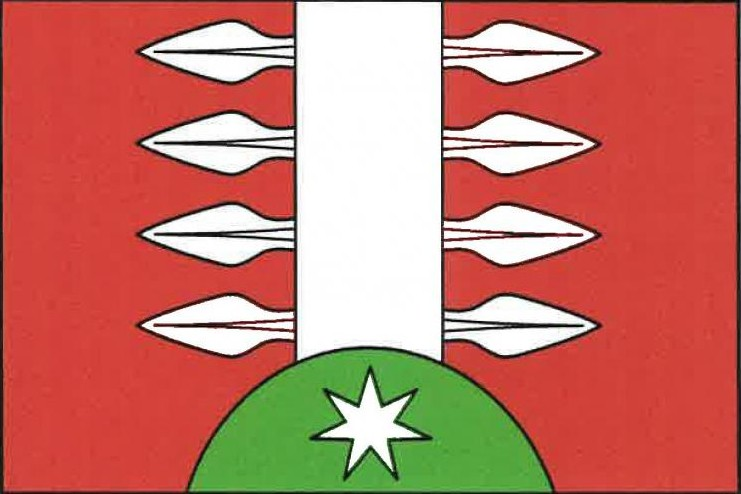
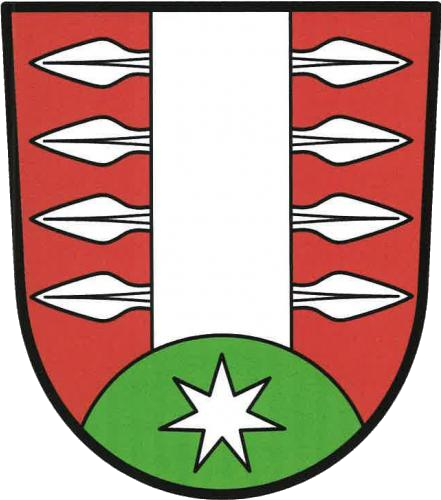
- Flag Coat of arms

- Location in the Czech Republic
- Coordinates: 49°30′50″N 14°41′33″E
- Country: Czech Republic
- Region: South Bohemian
- District: Tábor
- First mentioned: 1373

Area
  - Total: 14.20 km^{2} (5.48 sq mi)
- Elevation: 505 m (1,657 ft)

Population (2026-01-01)
  - Total: 306
  - Density: 21.5/km^{2} (55.8/sq mi)
- Time zone: UTC+1 (CET)
  - Summer (DST): UTC+2 (CEST)
- Postal code: 391 43
- Website: www.nemysl.cz

Nemyšl (German: Nemischl) is a municipality and village in Tábor District in the South Bohemian Region of the Czech Republic. It has about 300 inhabitants.

Nemyšl lies approximately 12 kilometres (7 mi) north of Tábor, 63 km (39 mi) north of České Budějovice, and 67 km (42 mi) south of Prague.

== Administrative division ==
Nemyšl consists of eight municipal parts (in brackets population according to the 2021 census):

- Nemyšl (108)
- Dědice (61)
- Dědičky (4)
- Hoštice (40)
- Prudice (28)
- Úlehle (12)
- Úraz (13)
- Záhoříčko (16)

== Demographics ==
Historical population
Year	Pop.	±%
1869	1,102	—
1880	1,089	−1.2%
1890	1,022	−6.2%
1900	908	−11.2%
1910	784	−13.7%
1921	790	+0.8%
1930	709	−10.3%
1950	528	−25.5%
1961	565	+7.0%
1970	411	−27.3%
1980	434	+5.6%
1991	353	−18.7%
2001	277	−21.5%
2011	290	+4.7%
2021	282	−2.8%
Source: Censuses

== Notable people ==
- Jindřich Waldes (1876–1941), entrepreneur
