= František Kupka =

Czech painter and graphic artist

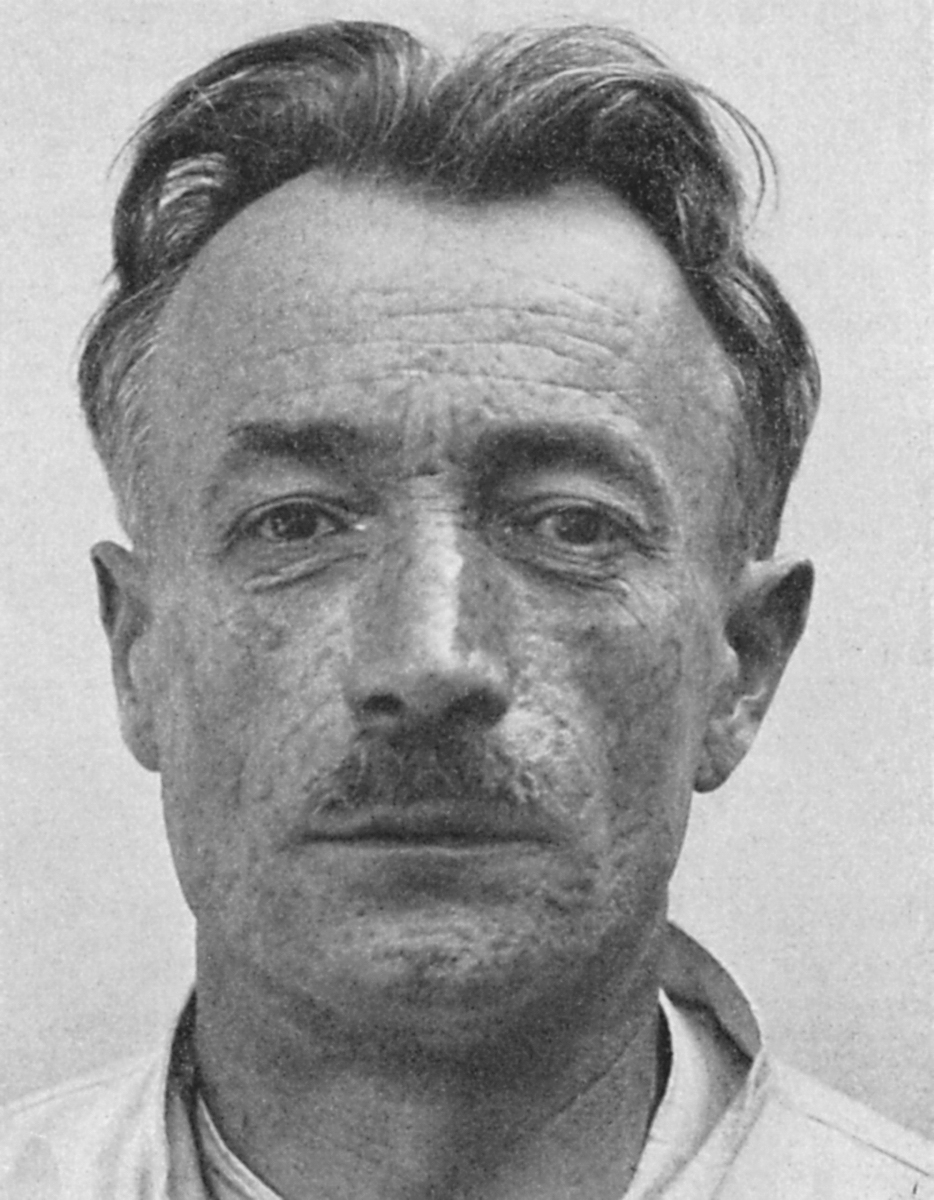
- Kupka in c. 1928
- Born: 23 September 1871; Opočno, Bohemia, Austria-Hungary
- Died: 24 June 1957 (aged 85); Puteaux, France
- Education: Academy of Fine Arts in Prague; Academy of Fine Arts Vienna; Académie Julian, Paris; École des Beaux-Arts, Paris
- Known for: Painting

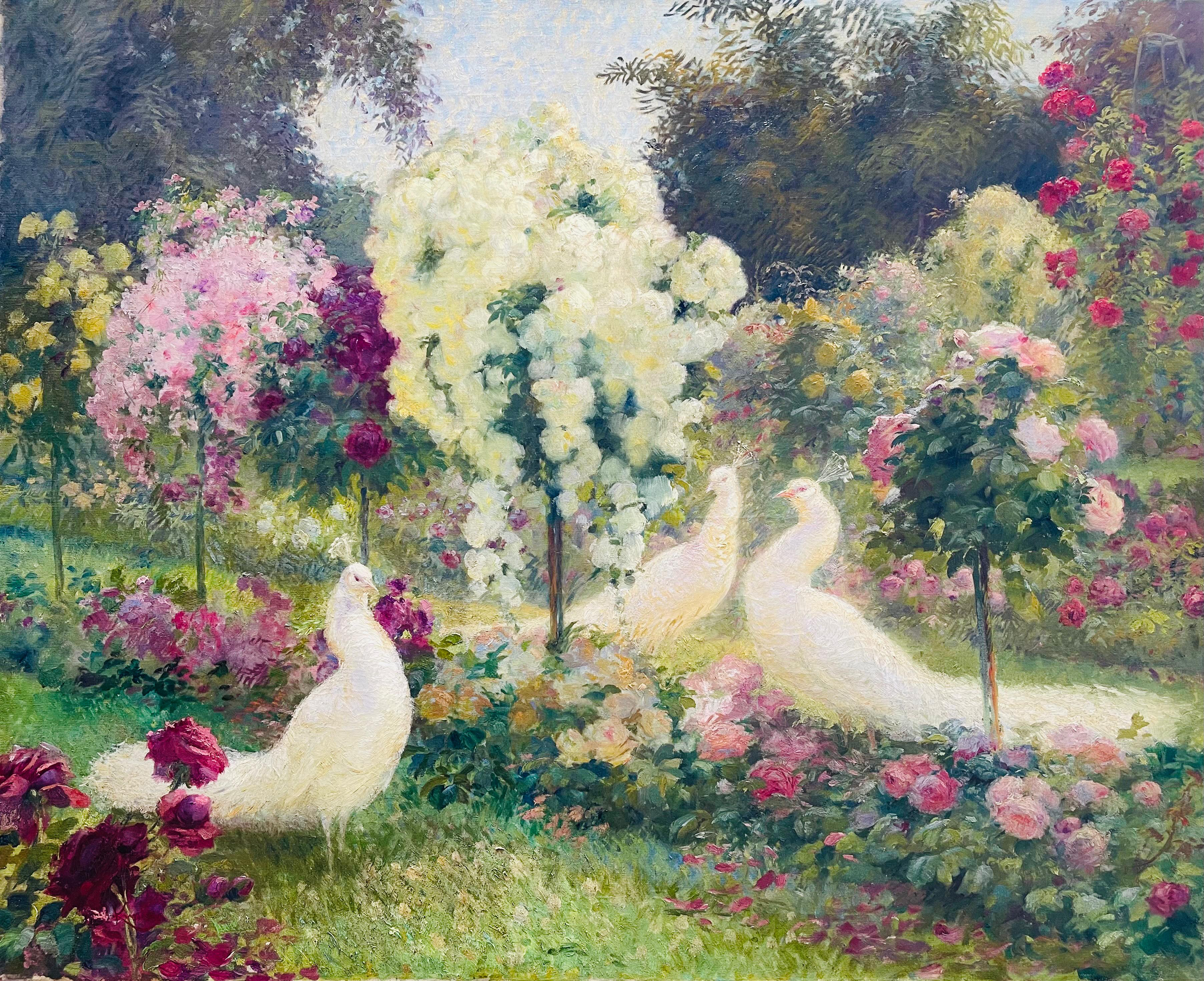
Garden with Peacocks (Zahrada s pávy), oil on canvas, 81 × 100 cm. František Kupka (1871–1957), dating from approximately 1896–1898. The composition depicts a flowering garden with white peacocks and is collection of Dr. Stefan Osuský, former Czechoslovak ambassador in Paris. The painting has been reproduced in publications by Marie Mžyková and Petr Wittlich and has been the subject of expert assessments by Czech art historians including Petr Wittlich, Marie Mžyková and Tomáš Vlček.

František Kupka (also known as Frank Kupka or François Kupka; 23 September 1871 – 24 June 1957) was a Czech painter and illustrator who moved from realism to abstract art, pioneering Orphism.

== Biography ==
=== Education ===
František Kupka was born in Opočno (eastern Bohemia) in Austria-Hungary (now in the Czech Republic) on 23 September 1871. From 1889 to 1892, he studied at the Academy of Fine Arts in Prague. At this time, he painted historical and patriotic themes. Kupka enrolled at the Academy of Fine Arts Vienna, where he concentrated on symbolic and allegorical subjects. He was influenced by the painter and social reformer Karl Wilhelm Diefenbach (1851–1913) and his naturistic life-style. Kupka exhibited at the Kunstverein, Vienna, in 1894. His involvement with theosophy and Eastern philosophy dates from this period. By spring 1894, Kupka had settled in Paris; there he attended the Académie Julian briefly and then studied with Jean-Pierre Laurens at the École des Beaux-Arts.

=== World War I ===
Kupka served as a volunteer in the First World War, and is mentioned in La Main coupée by Blaise Cendrars. Cendrars describes him as a "proud soldier, calm, placid, strong", but really too old to be a soldier, being at least 25 years older than the rest. When the regiment set out from Paris for the front in Picardy (they marched all the way on foot) Mrs. Kupka met the column as they arrived at the La Défense roundabout, near where they lived. She marched with them, carrying her husband's bag and his rifle. She would have marched all the way to the front, but at the end of the first day the colonel had her arrested and sent back to Paris. She later made her way to the front lines to spend time with her husband. Kupka himself left the front due to frostbite in the foot, caused by nights in the trenches waist-deep in freezing water.

=== Career ===
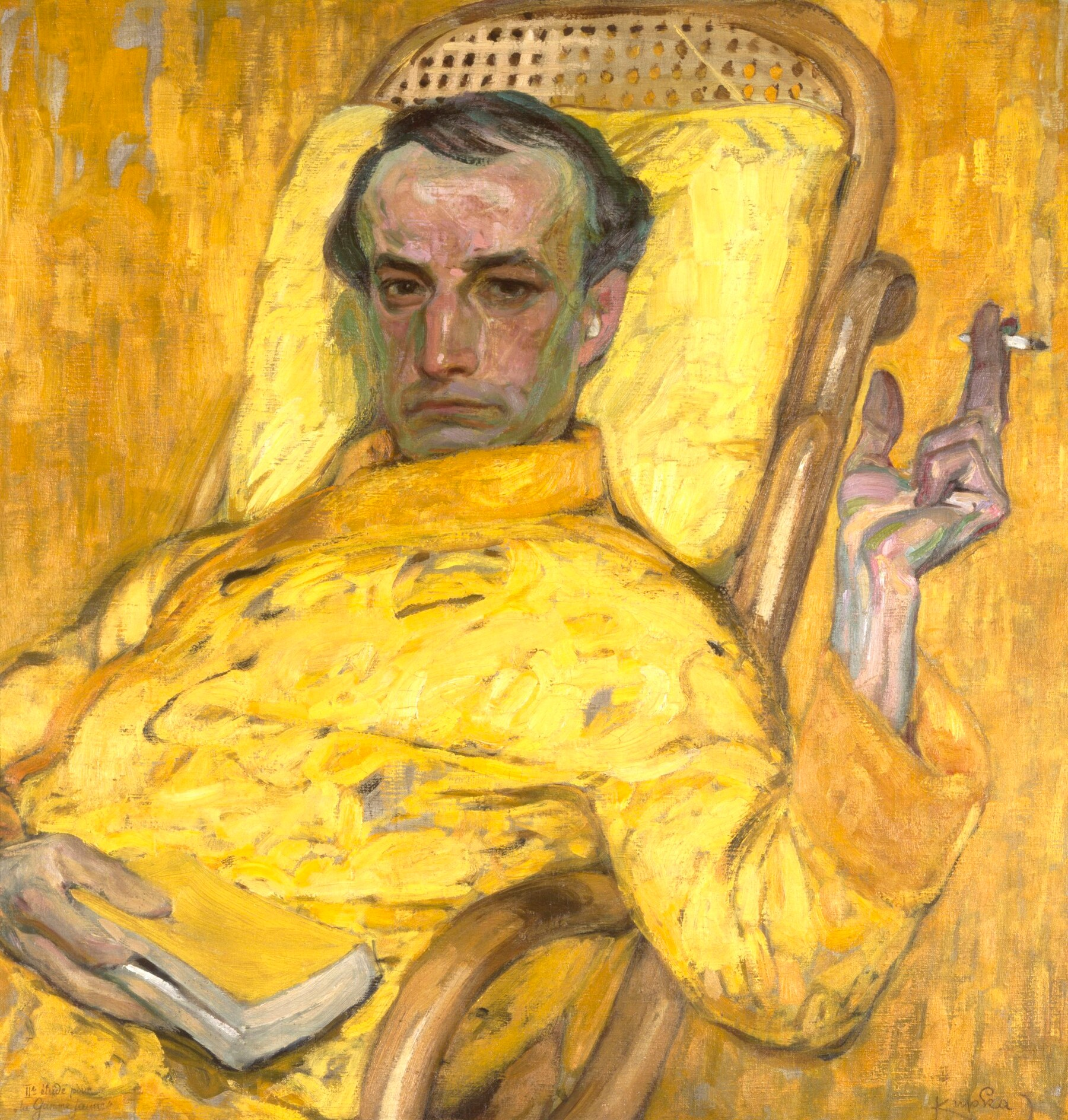
The Yellow Scale, 1907, oil on canvas, 78 x 74 cm, Museum of Fine Arts, Houston

Amorpha, Fugue en deux couleurs (Fugue in Two Colors), oil on canvas, 210 × 200 cm, 1912, National Gallery Prague

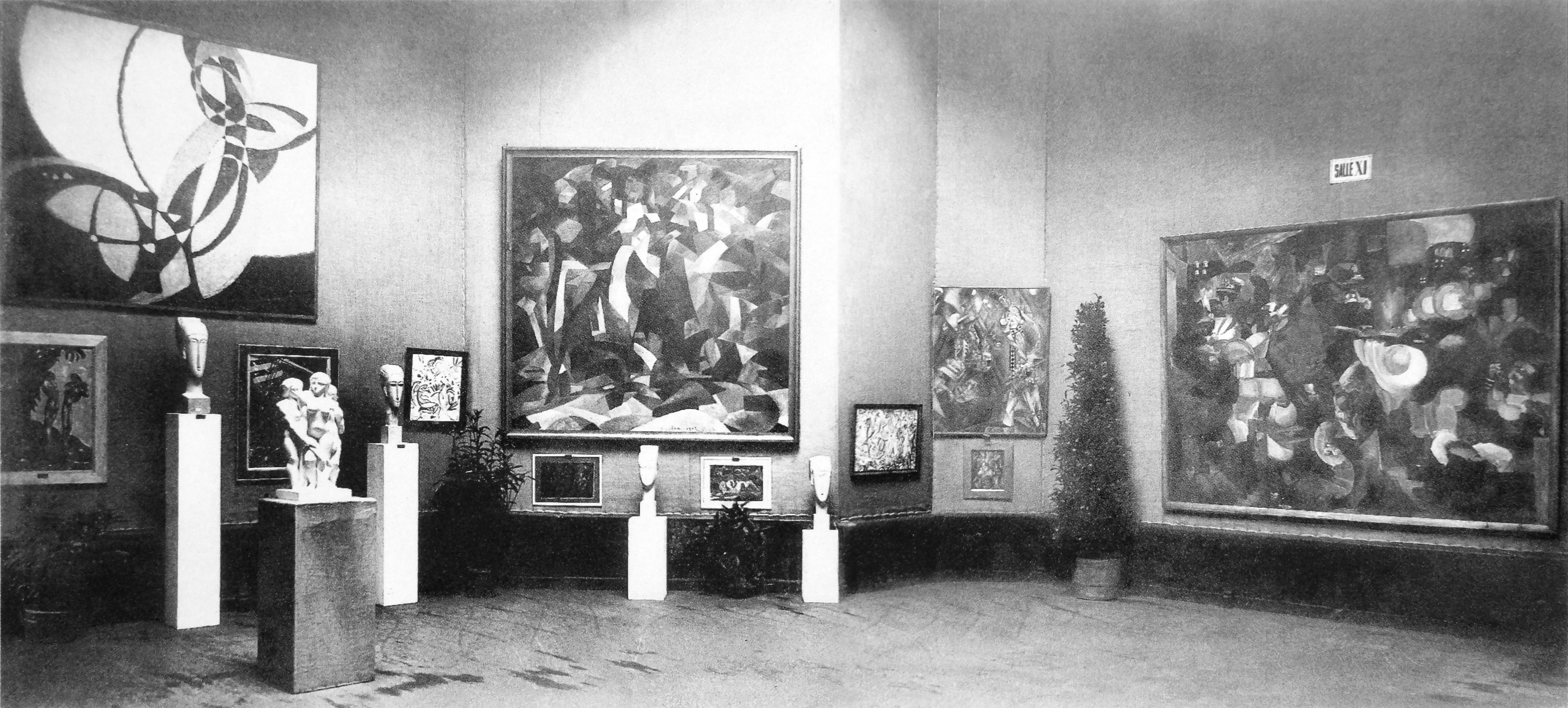
The Salon d'Automne of 1912, held in Paris at the Grand Palais from 1 October to 8 November. Kupka's Fugue in Two Colors is exhibited on the left. Other works are shown by Jean Metzinger (Dancer in a Café), Joseph Csaky (Groupe de femmes), Francis Picabia (La Source), Amedeo Modigliani (sculptures) and Henri Le Fauconnier (Mountaineers Attacked by Bears).

Kupka worked as an illustrator of books and posters and, during his early years in Paris, became known for his satirical drawings for newspapers and magazines. In 1906, he settled in Puteaux, a suburb of Paris, and the same year exhibited for the first time at the Salon d'Automne. In 1907 he published his self-portrait The Yellow Scale, believed to be his masterpiece. Kupka was deeply impressed by the first Futurist Manifesto, published in 1909 in Le Figaro. Kupka's 1909 painting Piano Keyboard/Lake marked a break in his representational style. His work became increasingly abstract around 1910–1911, reflecting his theories of motion, color, and the relationship between music and painting (orphism). In 1911, he attended meetings of the Puteaux Group (Section d'Or). In 1912, he exhibited his Amorpha, Fugue en deux couleurs, at the Salon des Indépendants in the Cubist room, although he did not wish to be identified with any movement. Creation in the Plastic Arts, a book Kupka completed in 1913, was published in Prague in 1923.

In 1931, he was a founding member of Abstraction-Création. In 1936, his work was included in the exhibition Cubism and Abstract Art at the Museum of Modern Art in New York City, and in an important show with another Czech painter, Alphonse Mucha, at the Jeu de Paume in Paris. A retrospective of his work took place at the Galerie Mánes in Prague in 1946. The same year, Kupka participated in the Salon des Réalités Nouvelles, where he continued to exhibit regularly until his death. During the early 1950s, he gained general recognition and had several solo shows in New York.

Between 1919 and 1938 Kupka was financially supported by his good friend, art collector and industrialist Jindřich Waldes who accumulated a substantial collection of his art. Kupka died in 1957 in Puteaux, France.

== Work ==
Among Kupka's first color studies, his painting The Yellow Scale (c. 1907) centers on yellow itself. He began developing his own color wheels (c. 1910), inspired by Isaac Newton and Hermann von Helmholtz, leading to a series of paintings, "Discs of Newton" (1911–1912). His strong interest in color theory and freeing colors from descriptive associations may have influenced Robert Delaunay.

- Planes by Colors
- The Colored One
- Reminiscence of a Cathedral
- Blue Space
- The Machine Drill

Works in Peggy Guggenheim Collection, Venice, Italy:

- Study for Woman Picking Flowers (Femme cueillant des fleurs), c. 1910
- Study for Amorpha, Warm Chromatics, Chromatique chaude and for Fugue in Two Colors (Fugue a deux couleurs), c. 1911-1912
- Vertical Planes (Plans verticaux), 1911–1912
- Study for Organization of Graphic Motifs I (Localisations de mobiles graphiques I), c. 1911–1912
- Around a point (Autour d'un point), c. 1920–1925

Other works include The Cathedral (Katedrála).

In March 2021, Kupka's Le Jaillissement II sold for £ 7,551,600 in an auction organized by Sotheby's, so far the highest price for his work.

== Personal life ==
Kupka was a vegetarian and took interest in theosophy. He practiced as a spiritualist medium and was alleged to have experienced clairvoyant trances. He was a believer in thought-forms which influenced his artwork. His theosophic visions inspired his painting Disks of Newton (Study for "Fugue in Two Colors"). He also practiced naturism.

== See also ==
- Kupka and Theosophy

== Bibliography ==
- Cendrars, Blaise (1989). La Main Coupée. Éditions Denoël. ISBN 978-2-07-036619-4.
- Kupka, František. La Création dans Les Arts Plastiques. Paris, 1923; edited and translated E. Abrams, 1989.
- Fauchereau, Serge (1989). Kupka. Rizzoli. ISBN 978-0-8478-1047-5.
- Kupka, František. La Création dans Les Arts Plastiques. Paris, 1923; edited and translated E. Abrams, 1989.
