= Henri Matisse =

French artist (1869–1954)

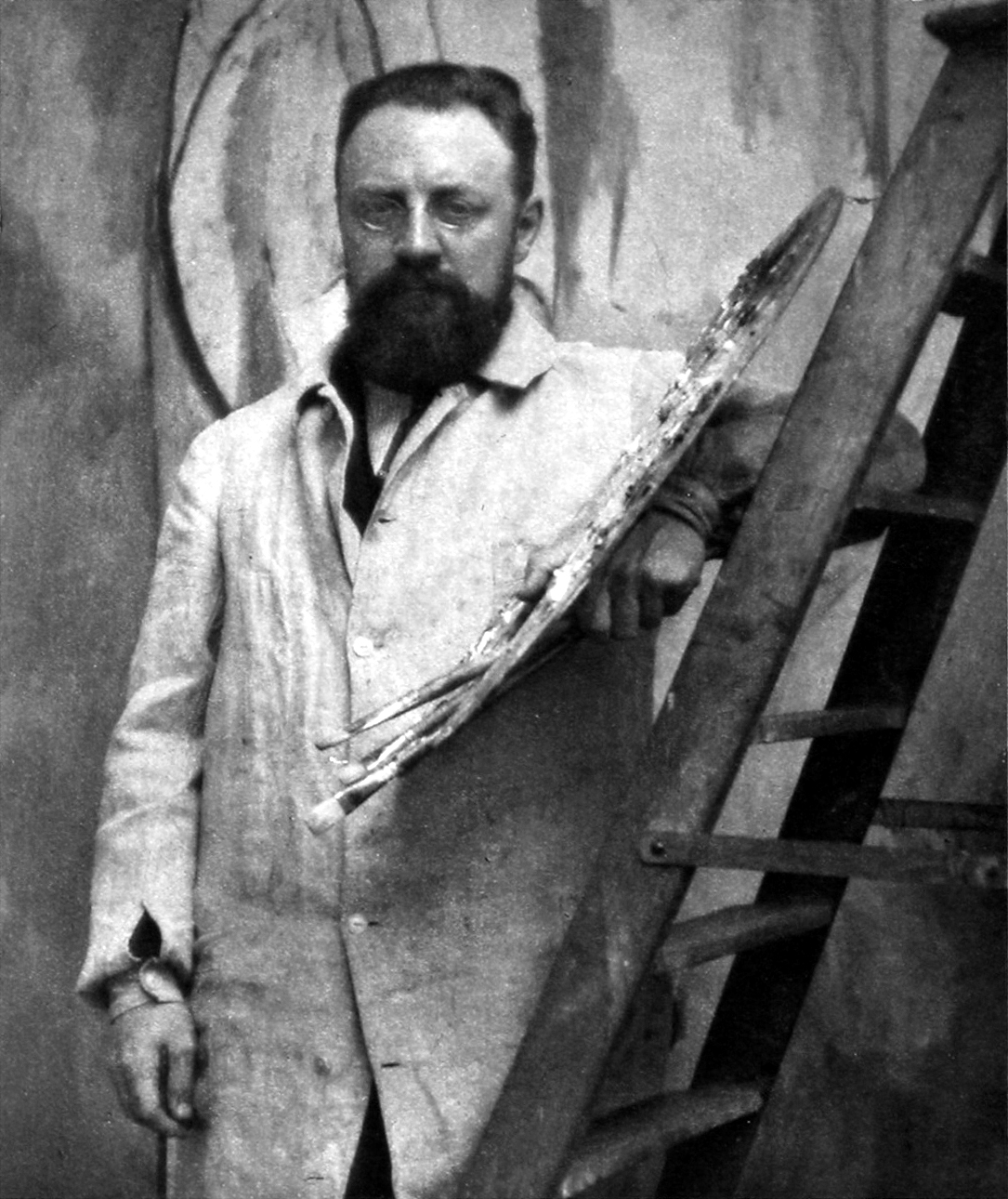
- Matisse in 1913
- Born: Henri Émile Benoît Matisse; 31 December 1869; Le Cateau-Cambrésis, France
- Died: 3 November 1954 (aged 84); Nice, France
- Education: Académie Julian, William-Adolphe Bouguereau, Gustave Moreau
- Known for: Painting; printmaking; sculpture; drawing; collage
- Notable work: Woman with a Hat (1905); The Joy of Life (1906); Nu bleu (1907); La Danse (1909); L'Atelier Rouge (1911); The Snail (1953)
- Movement: Fauvism, Modernism, Post-Impressionism
- Spouse: Amélie Noellie Parayre (m. 1898; div. 1939)
- Children: 3, including Pierre
- Patrons: Sergei Shchukin, Gertrude Stein, Etta Cone, Claribel Cone, Sarah Stein, Albert C. Barnes

Henri Émile Benoît Matisse (French: [ɑ̃ʁi emil bənwa matis]; 31 December 1869 – 3 November 1954) was a French visual artist, known for both his use of colour and his fluid and original draughtsmanship. He was a draughtsman, printmaker, and sculptor, but is known primarily as a painter.

Matisse is commonly regarded, along with Pablo Picasso, as one of the artists who best helped to define the revolutionary developments in the visual arts throughout the opening decades of the twentieth century, responsible for significant developments in painting and sculpture.

The intensity of colour in the works he painted between 1900 and 1905 brought him notoriety as one of the Fauves (French for "wild beasts"). Many of his finest works were created in the decade or so after 1906, when he developed a rigorous style that emphasized flattened forms and decorative pattern. In 1917, he relocated to a suburb of Nice on the French Riviera, and the more relaxed style of his work during the 1920s gained him critical acclaim as an upholder of the classical tradition in French painting. After 1930, he adopted a bolder simplification of form. When ill health in his final years prevented him from painting, he created an important body of work in the medium of cut paper collage.

His mastery of the expressive language of colour and drawing, displayed in a body of work spanning over a half-century, won him recognition as a leading figure in modern art.

== Early life and education ==
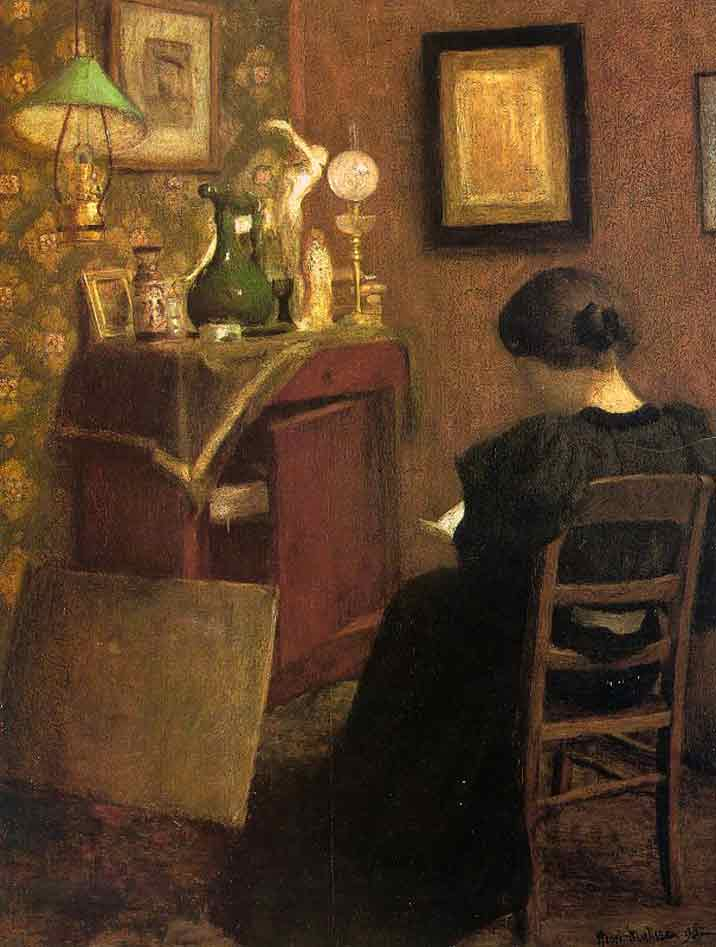
Woman Reading (La Liseuse), 1895, oil on board, 61.5 x 48 cm, Le Cateau-Cambrésis, Musée Matisse

Matisse was born in Le Cateau-Cambrésis, in the Nord department in Northern France on New Year's Eve in 1869, the oldest son of a wealthy grain merchant. He grew up in Bohain-en-Vermandois, Picardie. In 1887, he went to Paris to study law, working as a court administrator in Le Cateau-Cambrésis after gaining his qualification. He first started to paint in 1889, after his mother brought him art supplies during a period of convalescence following an attack of appendicitis. He discovered "a kind of paradise" as he later described it, and decided to become an artist, deeply disappointing his father.

In 1891, he returned to Paris to study art at the Académie Julian under William-Adolphe Bouguereau and at the École Nationale des Beaux-Arts under Gustave Moreau. Initially he painted still lifes and landscapes in a traditional style, at which he achieved reasonable proficiency. Matisse was influenced by the works of earlier masters such as Jean-Baptiste-Siméon Chardin, Nicolas Poussin, and Antoine Watteau, as well as by modern artists, such as Édouard Manet, and by Japanese art. Chardin was one of the painters Matisse most admired; as an art student he made copies of four of Chardin's paintings in the Louvre.

In 1896, Matisse, an unknown art student at the time, visited the Australian painter John Russell on the island of Belle Île off the coast of Brittany. Russell introduced him to Impressionism and to the work of Vincent van Gogh—who had been a friend of Russell—and gave him a Van Gogh drawing. Matisse's style changed completely: abandoning his earth-coloured palette for bright colours. He later said Russell was his teacher, and that Russell had explained colour theory to him. The same year, Matisse exhibited five paintings in the salon of the Société Nationale des Beaux-Arts, two of which were purchased by the state.

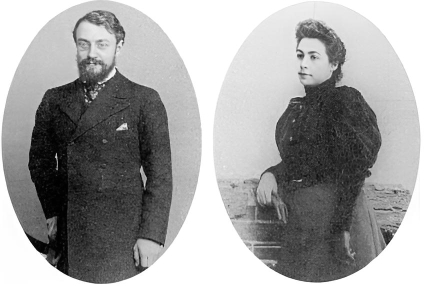
Henri and Amélie Matisse, 1898

With the model Caroline Joblau, he had a daughter, Marguerite, born in 1894. In 1898, he married Amélie Noellie Parayre; the two raised Marguerite together and had two sons, Jean (born 1899) and Pierre (born 1900). Marguerite and Amélie often served as models for Matisse.

In 1898, on the advice of Camille Pissarro, he went to London to study the paintings of J. M. W. Turner and then went on a trip to Corsica. Upon his return to Paris in February 1899, he worked beside Albert Marquet and met André Derain, Jean Puy, and Jules Flandrin. Matisse immersed himself in the work of others and went into debt from buying work from painters he admired. The work he hung and displayed in his home included a plaster bust by Rodin, a painting by Gauguin, a drawing by Van Gogh, and Cézanne's Three Bathers. In Cézanne's sense of pictorial structure and colour, Matisse found his main inspiration.

Many of Matisse's paintings from 1898 to 1901 make use of a Divisionist technique he adopted after reading Paul Signac's essay, "D'Eugène Delacroix au Néo-impressionisme".

In May 1902, Amélie's parents became ensnared in a major financial scandal, the Humbert Affair. Her mother (who was the Humbert family's housekeeper) and father became scapegoats in the scandal, and her family was menaced by angry mobs of fraud victims. According to art historian Hilary Spurling, "their public exposure, followed by the arrest of his father-in-law, left Matisse as the sole breadwinner for an extended family of seven". During 1902 to 1903, Matisse adopted a style of painting that was comparatively somber and concerned with form, a change possibly intended to produce saleable works during this time of material hardship. Having made his first attempt at sculpture, a copy after Antoine-Louis Barye, in 1899, he devoted much of his energy to working in clay, completing The Slave in 1903.

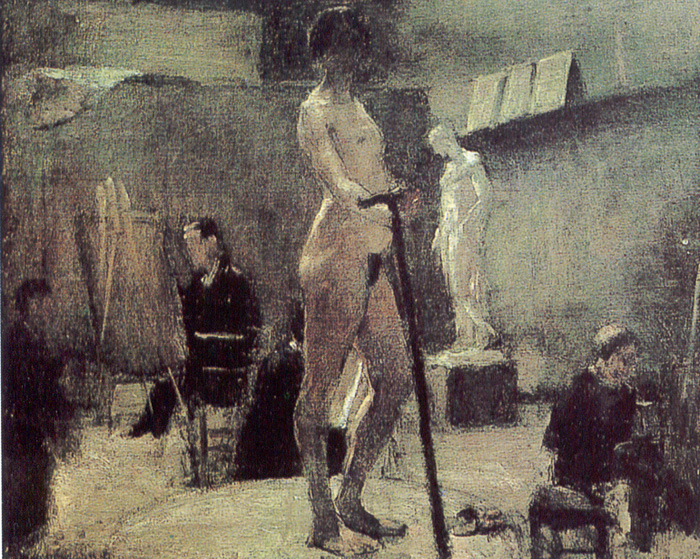
Gustave Moreau's Studio, 1894– 1895

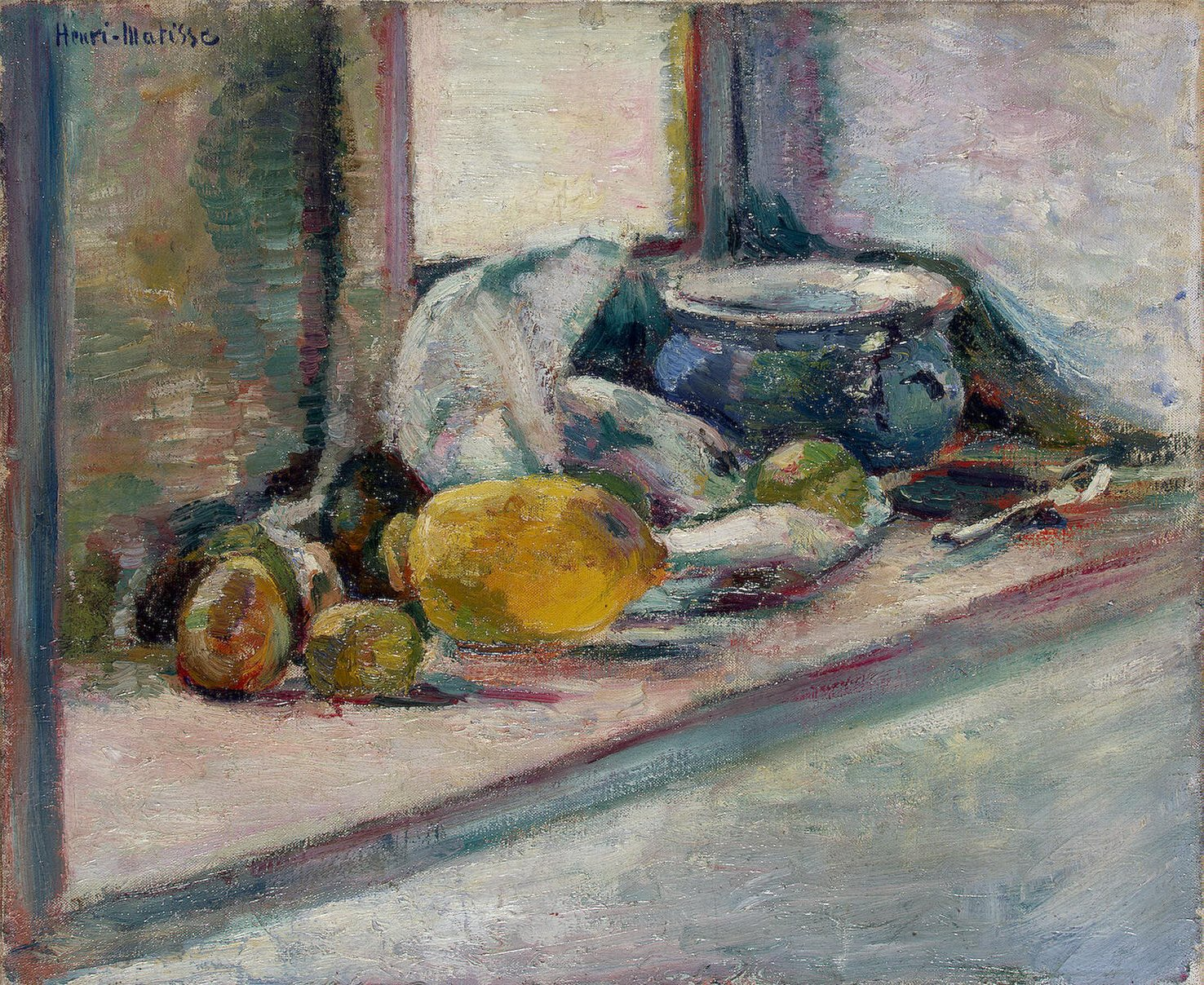
Blue Pot and Lemon (1897), Hermitage Museum, St. Petersburg, Russia

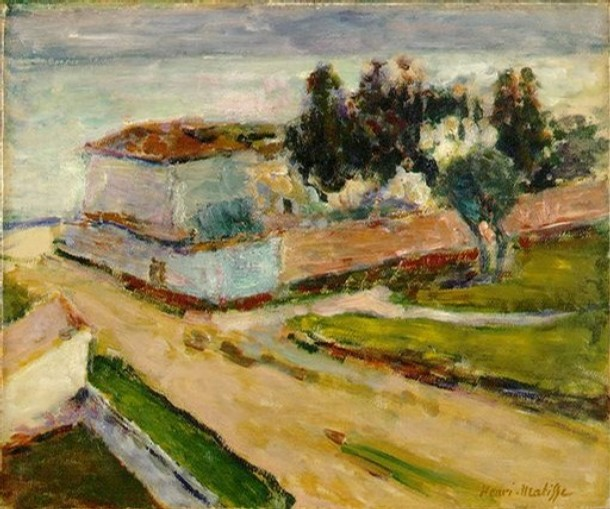
Le Mur Rose, 1898, Jewish Museum Frankfurt

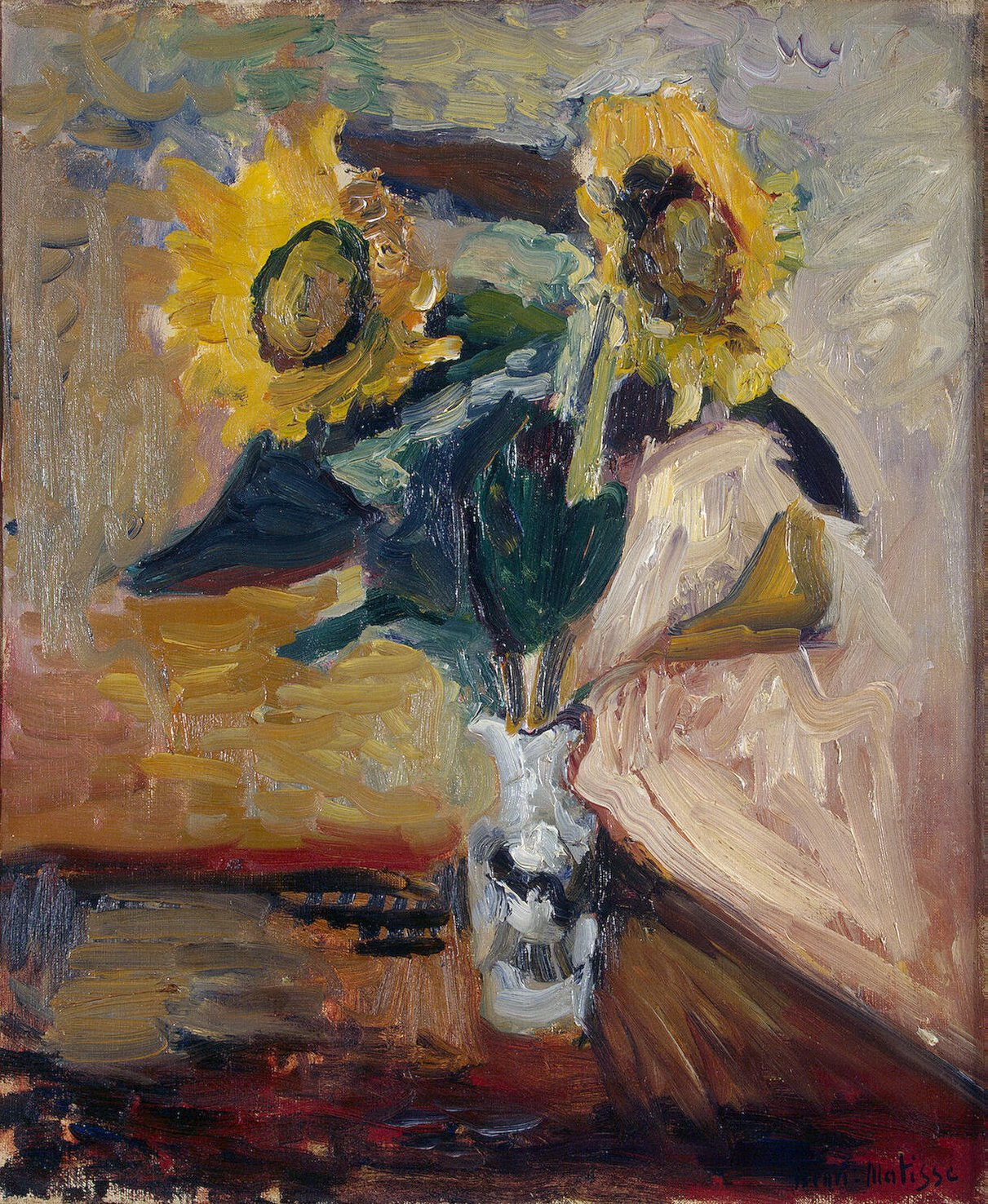
Vase of Sunflowers (1898), Hermitage Museum, St. Petersburg, Russia

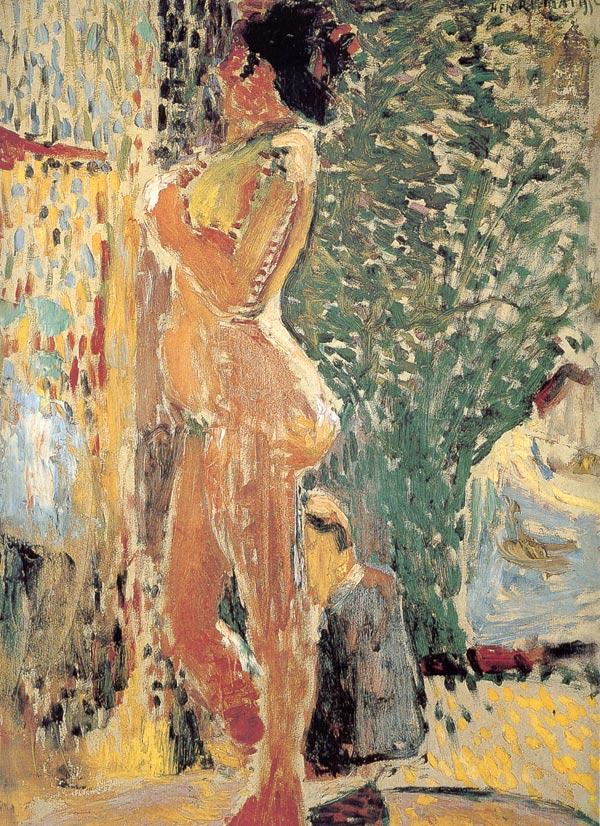
Study of a Nude, 1899, Artizon Museum, Tokyo

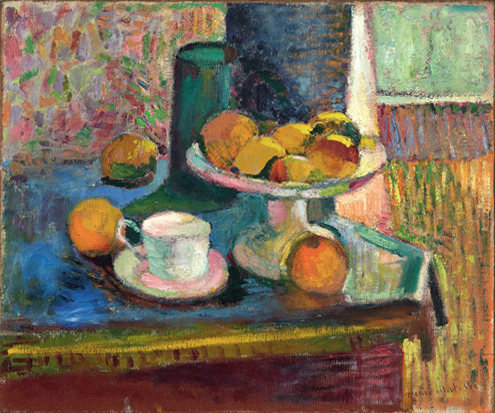
Still Life with Compote, Apples and Oranges, 1899, The Cone Collection, Baltimore Museum of Art

== Fauvism ==
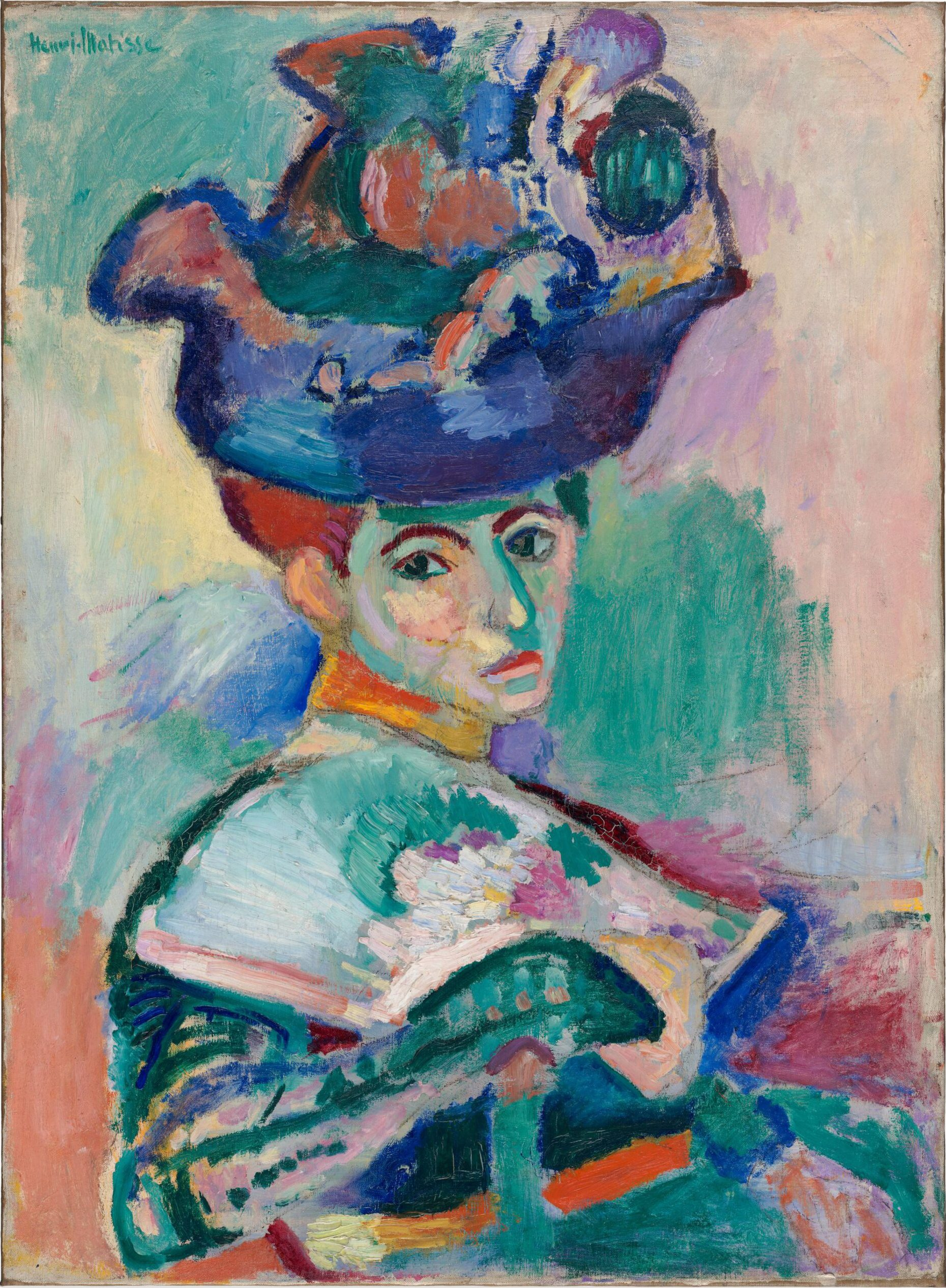
Woman with a Hat, 1905. San Francisco Museum of Modern Art

Fauvism as a style began around 1900 and continued beyond 1910. The movement as such lasted only a few years, 1904–1908, and had three exhibitions. The leaders of the movement were Matisse and André Derain. Matisse's first solo exhibition was at Ambroise Vollard's gallery in 1904, without much success. His fondness for bright and expressive colour became more pronounced after he spent the summer of 1904 painting in St. Tropez with the neo-Impressionists Signac and Henri-Edmond Cross. In that year, he painted the most important of his works in the neo-Impressionist style, Luxe, Calme et Volupté. In 1905, he travelled southwards again to work with André Derain at Collioure. His paintings of this period are characterised by flat shapes and controlled lines, using pointillism in a less rigorous way than before.

Matisse and a group of artists now known as "Fauves" exhibited together in a room at the Salon d'Automne in 1905. The paintings expressed emotion with wild, often dissonant colours, without regard for the subject's natural colours. Matisse showed The Open Window and Woman with a Hat at the Salon. Critic Louis Vauxcelles commented on a lone sculpture surrounded by an "orgy of pure tones" as "Donatello chez les fauves" (Donatello among the wild beasts), referring to a Renaissance-type sculpture that shared the room with them. His comment was printed on 17 October 1905 in Gil Blas, a daily newspaper, and passed into popular usage. The exhibition garnered harsh criticism—"A pot of paint has been flung in the face of the public", said the critic Camille Mauclair—but also some favourable attention. When the painting that was singled out for special condemnation, Matisse's, Woman with the Hat, was bought by Gertrude and Leo Stein, the embattled artist's morale improved considerably.

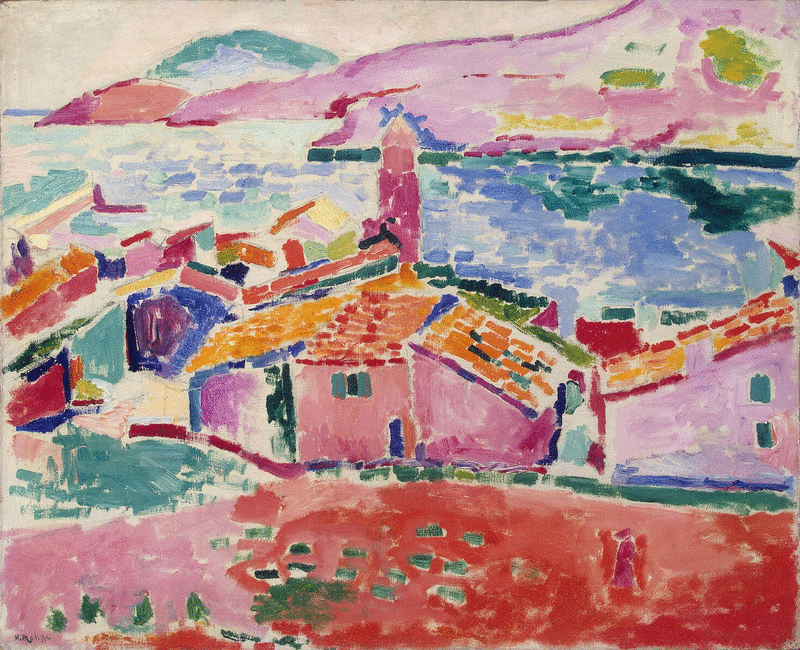
Les toits de Collioure, 1905, oil on canvas, The Hermitage, St. Petersburg, Russia

Matisse was recognised as a leader of the Fauves, along with André Derain; the two were friendly rivals, each with his own followers. Other members were Georges Braque, Raoul Dufy, and Maurice de Vlaminck. The Symbolist painter Gustave Moreau (1826–1898) was the movement's inspirational teacher. As a professor at the École des Beaux-Arts in Paris, he pushed his students to think outside of the lines of formality and to follow their visions.

In 1907, Guillaume Apollinaire, commenting about Matisse in an article published in La Falange, wrote, "We are not here in the presence of an extravagant or an extremist undertaking: Matisse's art is eminently reasonable." But Matisse's work of the time also encountered vehement criticism, and it was difficult for him to provide for his family. His painting Nu bleu (1907) was burned in effigy at the Armory Show in Chicago in 1913.

The decline of the Fauvist movement after 1906 did not affect the career of Matisse; many of his finest works were created between 1906 and 1917, when he was an active part of the great gathering of artistic talent in Montparnasse, even though he did not quite fit in, with his conservative appearance and strict bourgeois work habits. He continued to absorb new influences. He travelled to Algeria in 1906 studying African art and Primitivism. After viewing a large exhibition of Islamic art in Munich in 1910, he spent two months in Spain studying Moorish art. He visited Morocco in 1912 and again in 1913 and while painting in Tangier he made several changes to his work, including his use of black as a colour. The effect on Matisse's art was a new boldness in the use of intense, unmodulated colour, as in L'Atelier Rouge (1911).

Matisse had a long association with the Russian art collector Sergei Shchukin. He created one of his major works La Danse specially for Shchukin as part of a two painting commission, the other painting being Music (1910). An earlier version of La Danse (1909) is in the collection of The Museum of Modern Art in New York City.

=== Selected works (1901–1910) ===
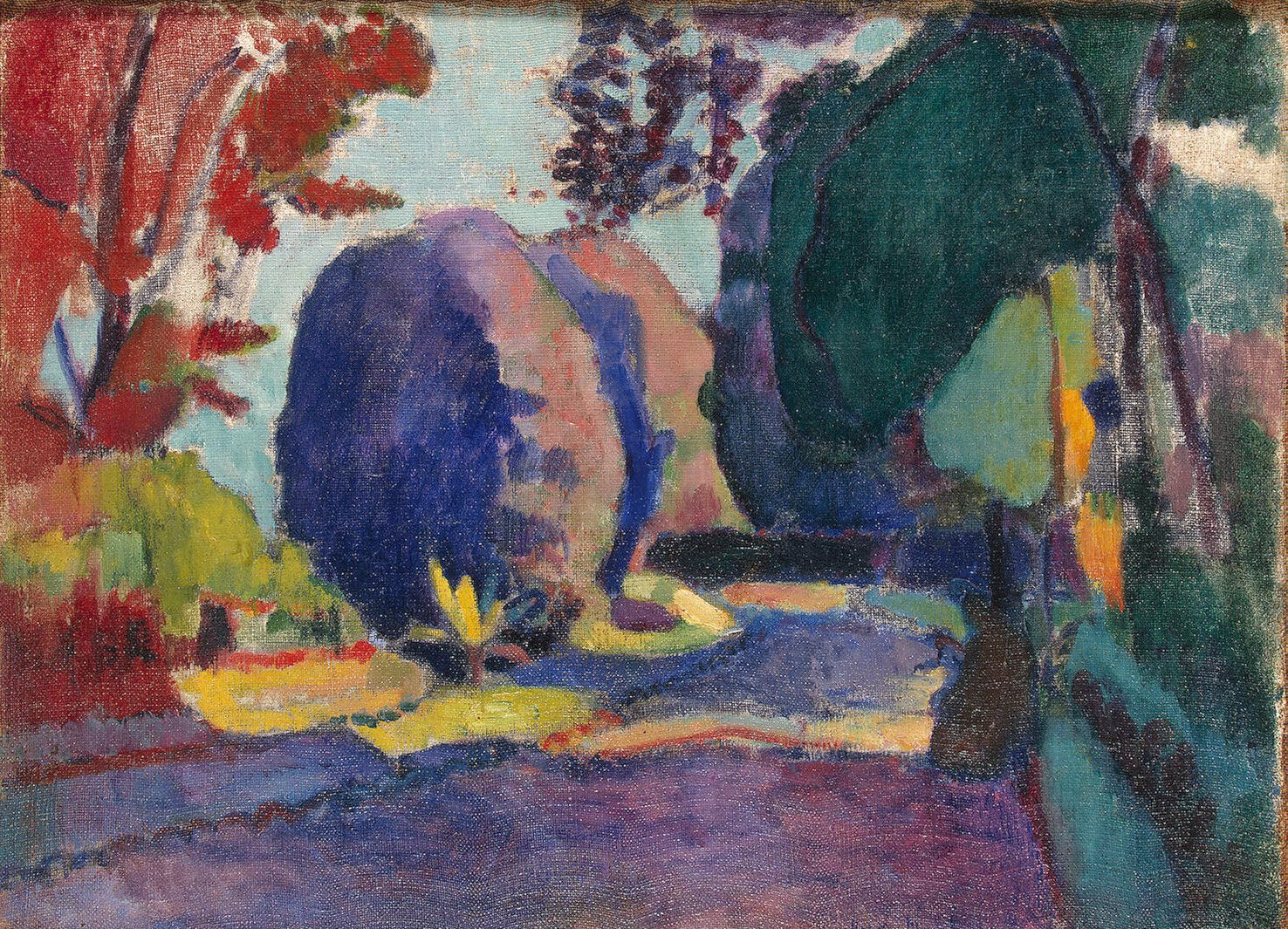
Luxembourg Gardens, 1901, Hermitage Museum, St. Petersburg, Russia

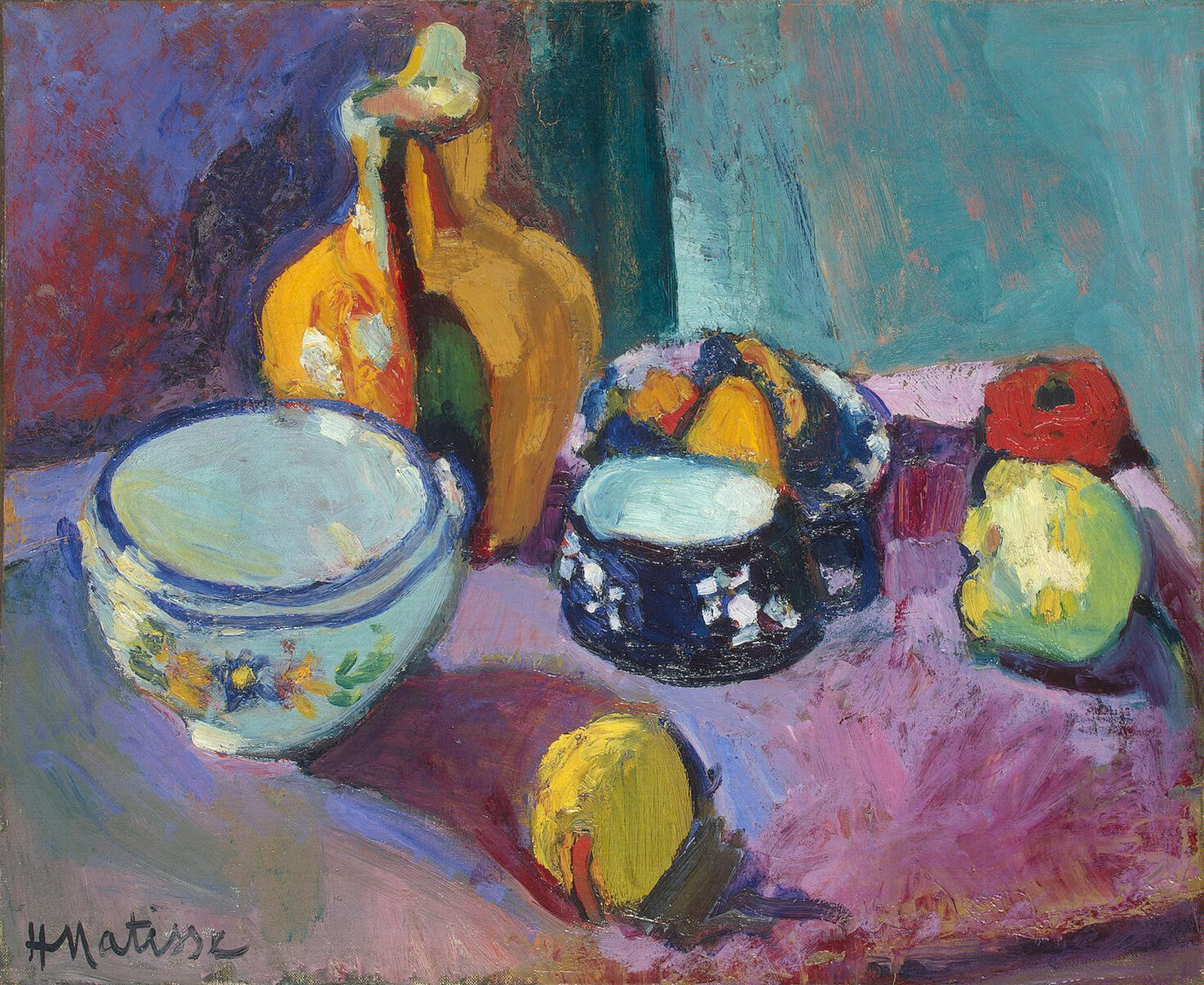
Dishes and Fruit, 1901, Hermitage Museum, St. Petersburg, Russia

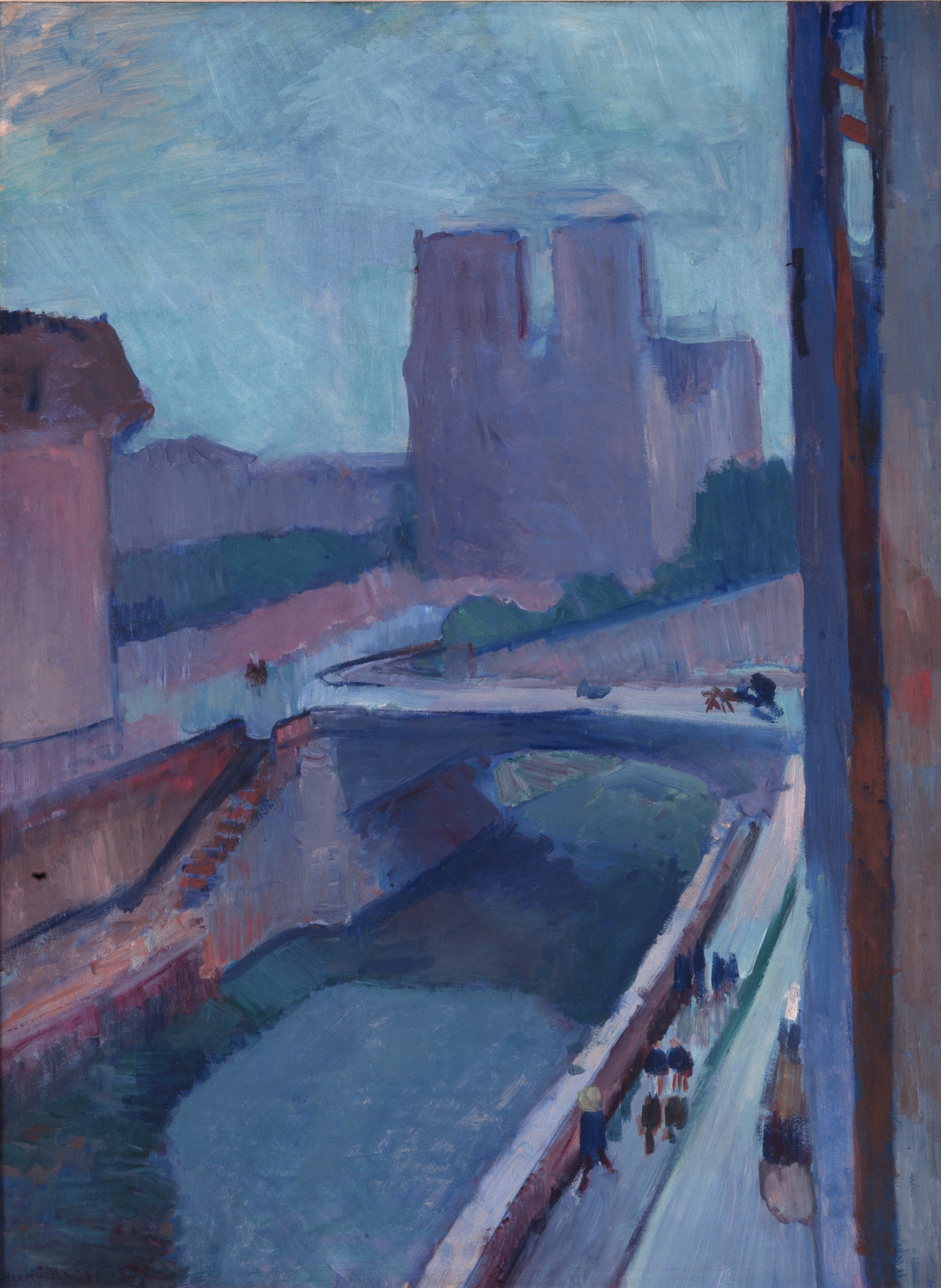
A Glimpse of Notre-Dame in the Late Afternoon, 1902, Albright–Knox Art Gallery, Buffalo, New York

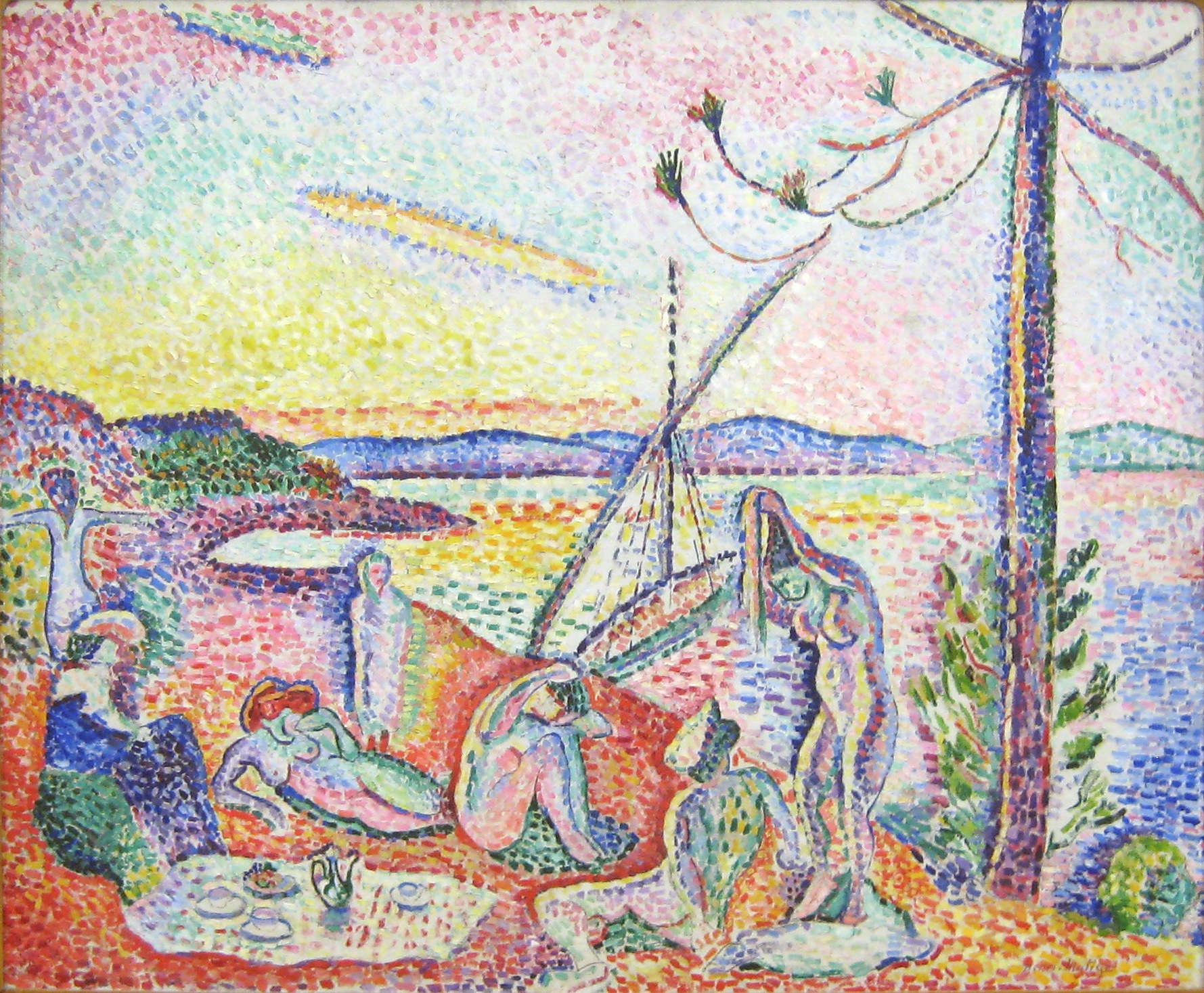
Luxe, Calme et Volupté, 1904, Musée d'Orsay, Paris, France

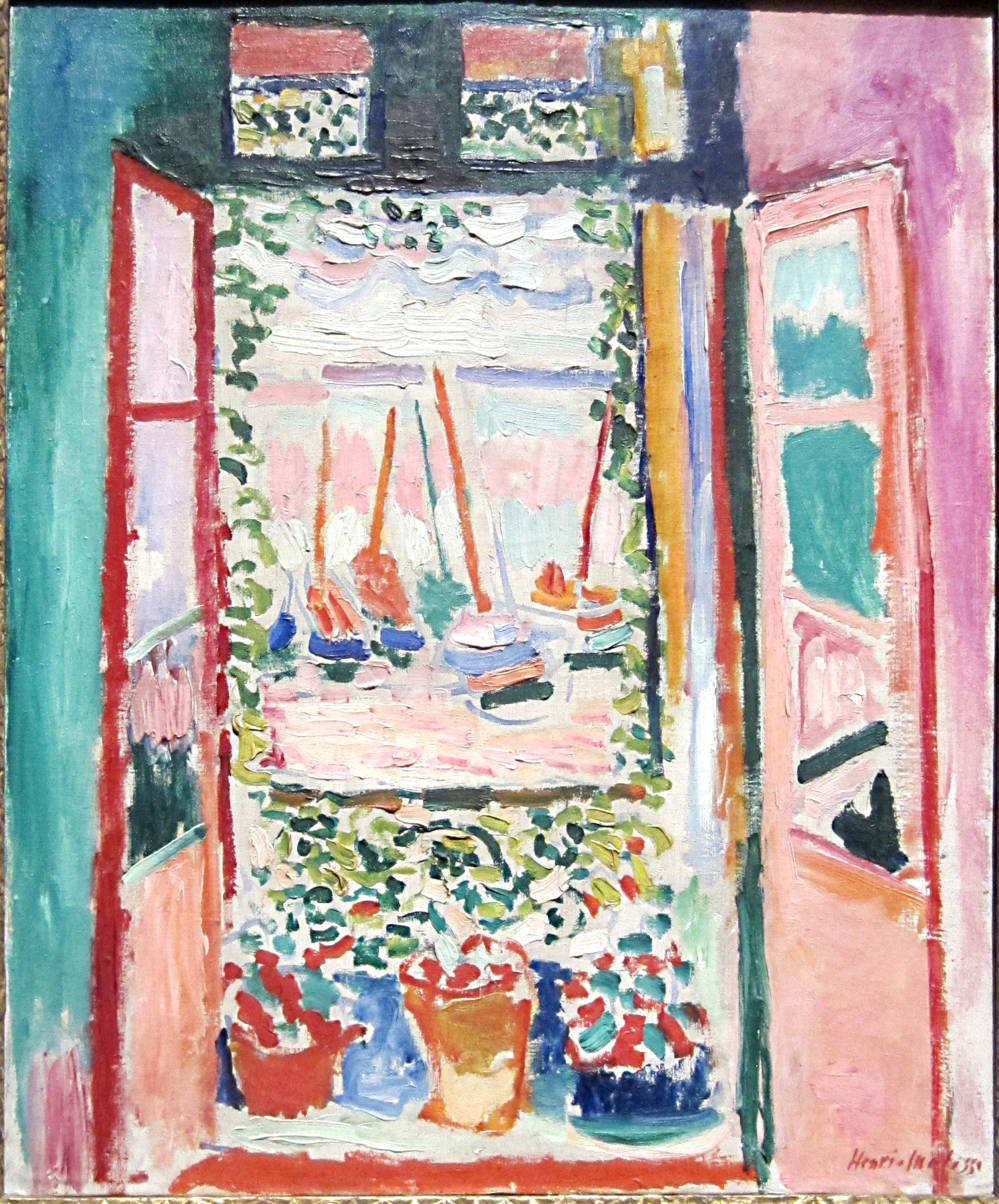
Open Window, Collioure, 1905, National Gallery of Art, Washington, D.C.

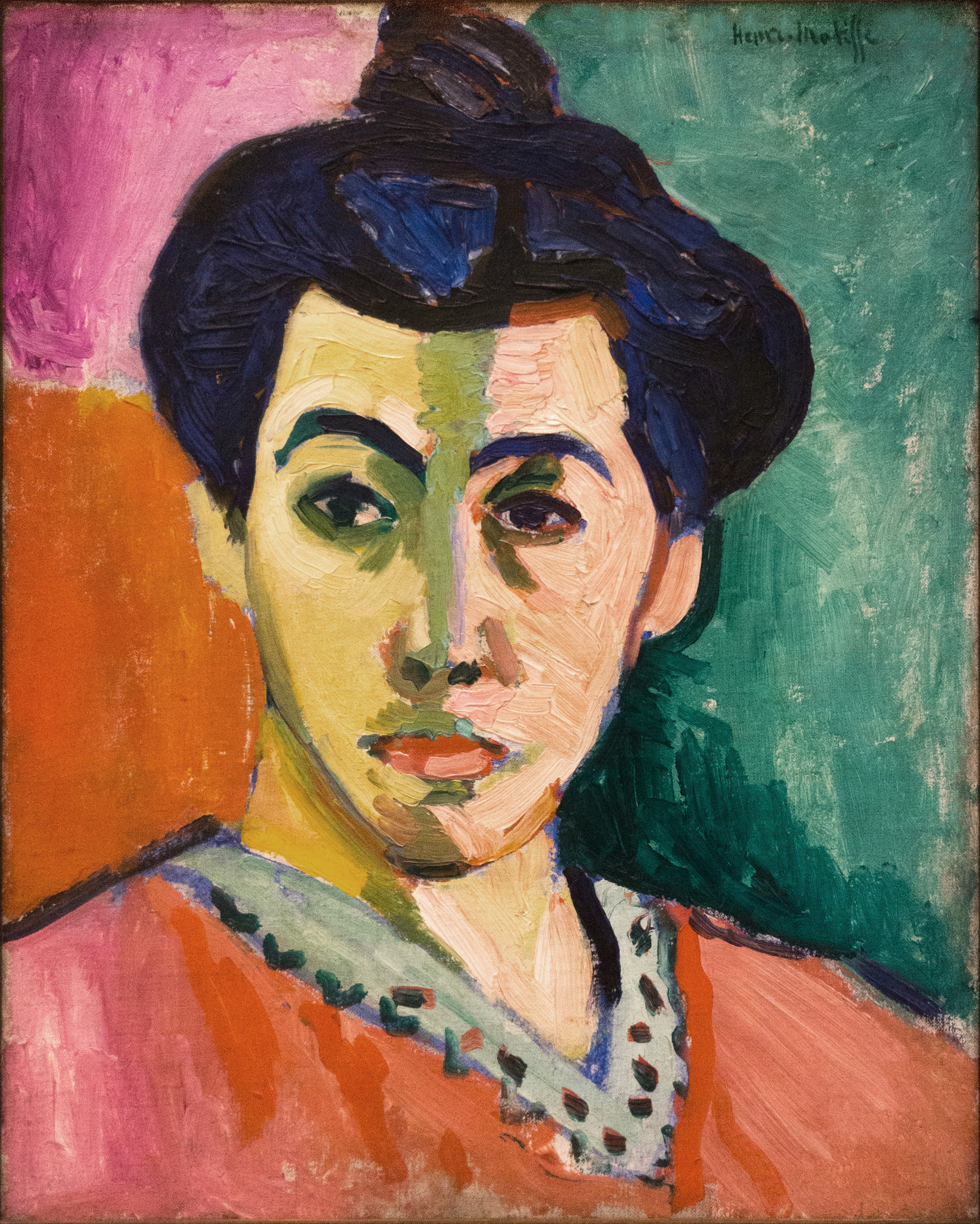
Portrait of Madame Matisse (The green line), 1905, Statens Museum for Kunst, Copenhagen, Denmark

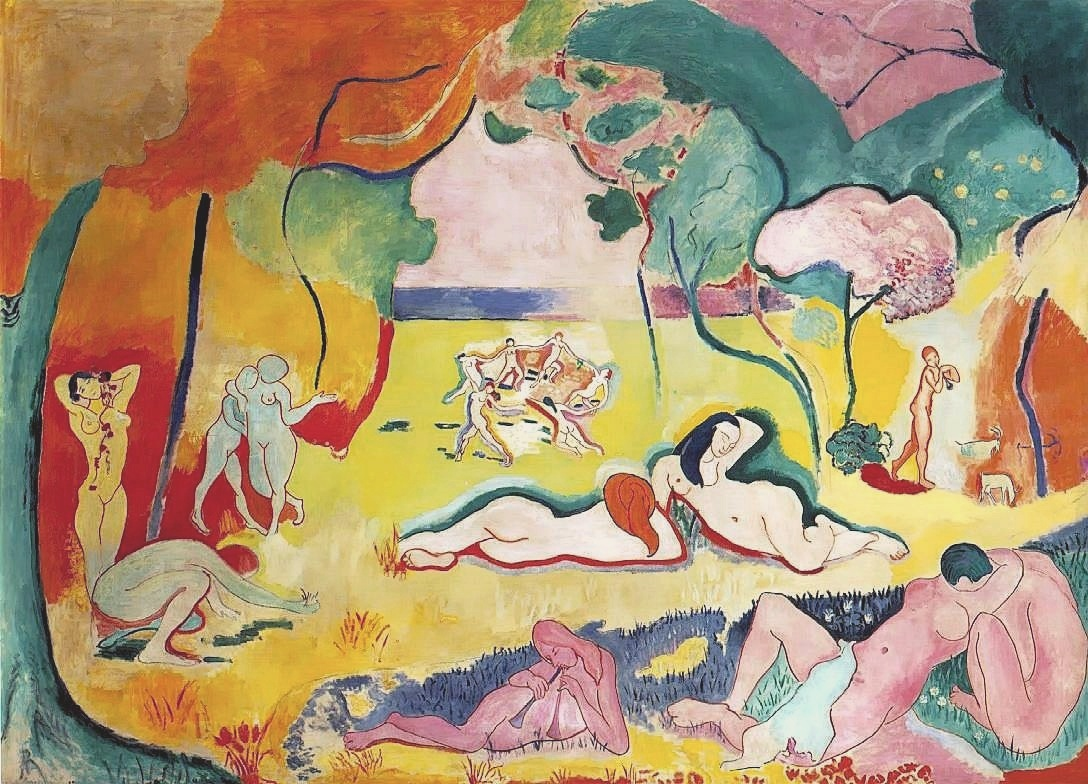
Le bonheur de vivre, 1905–6, Barnes Foundation, Philadelphia, Pennsylvania

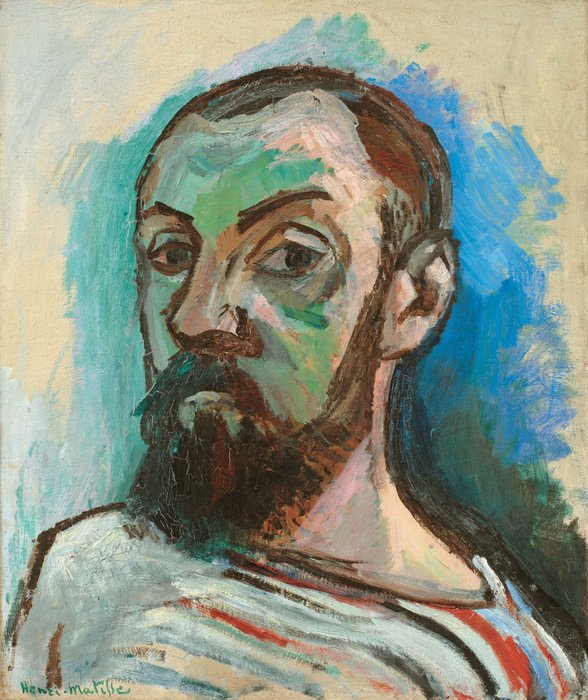
Self-Portrait in a Striped T-shirt, 1906, Statens Museum for Kunst, Copenhagen, Denmark

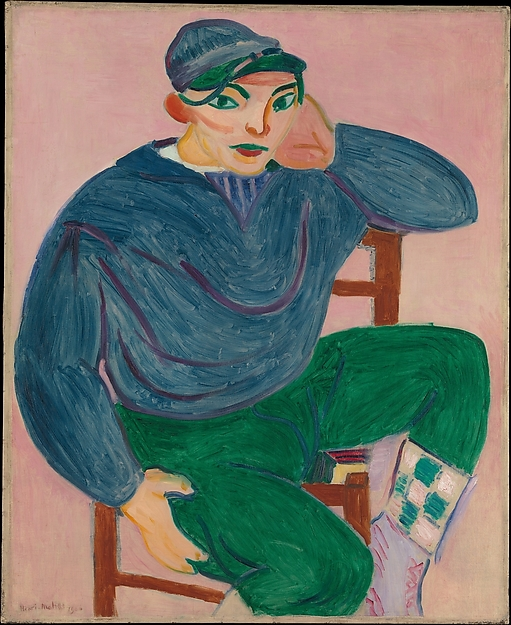
The Young Sailor II, 1906, Metropolitan Museum of Art, New York City

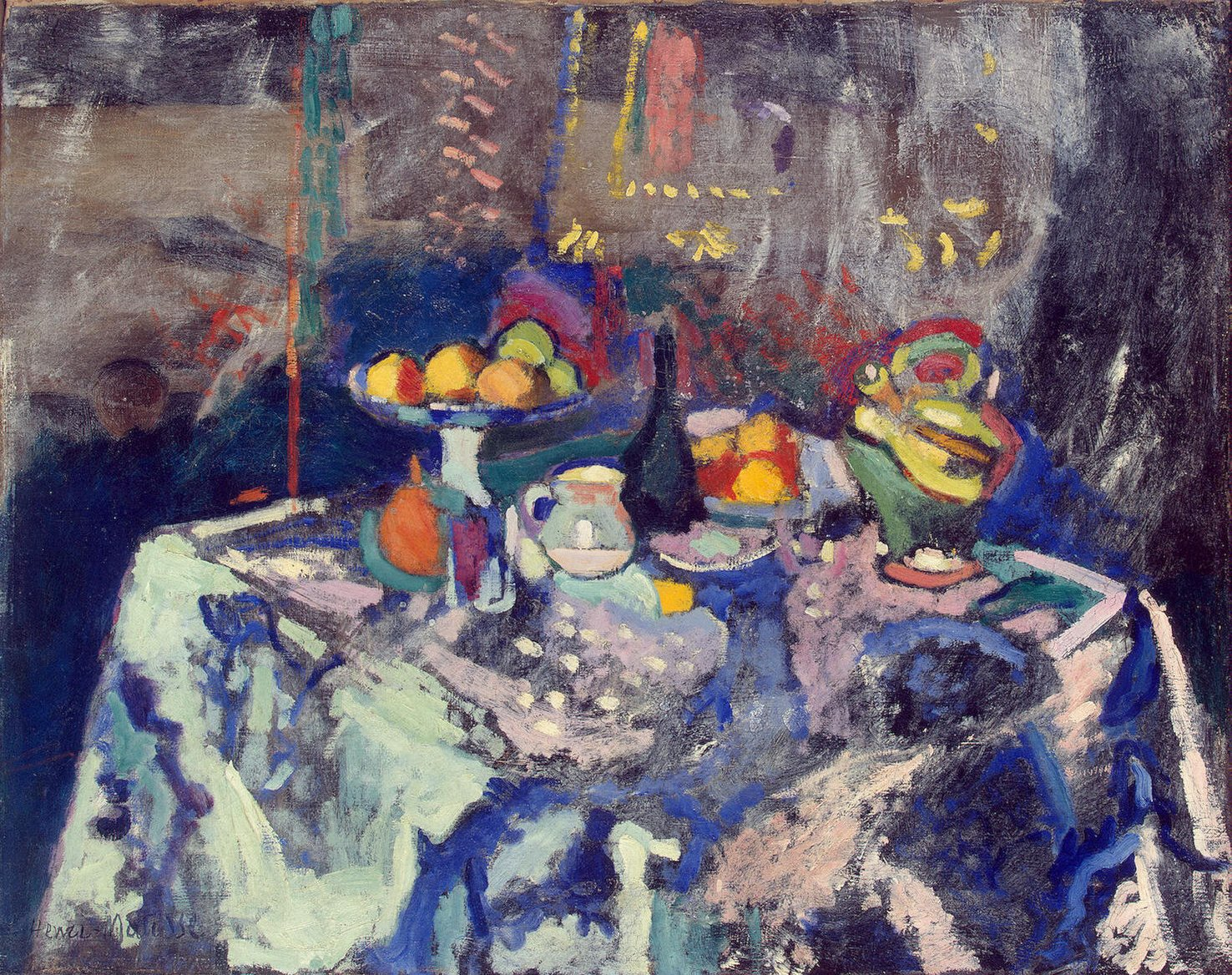
Vase, Bottle and Fruit, 1906, Hermitage Museum, St. Petersburg, Russia

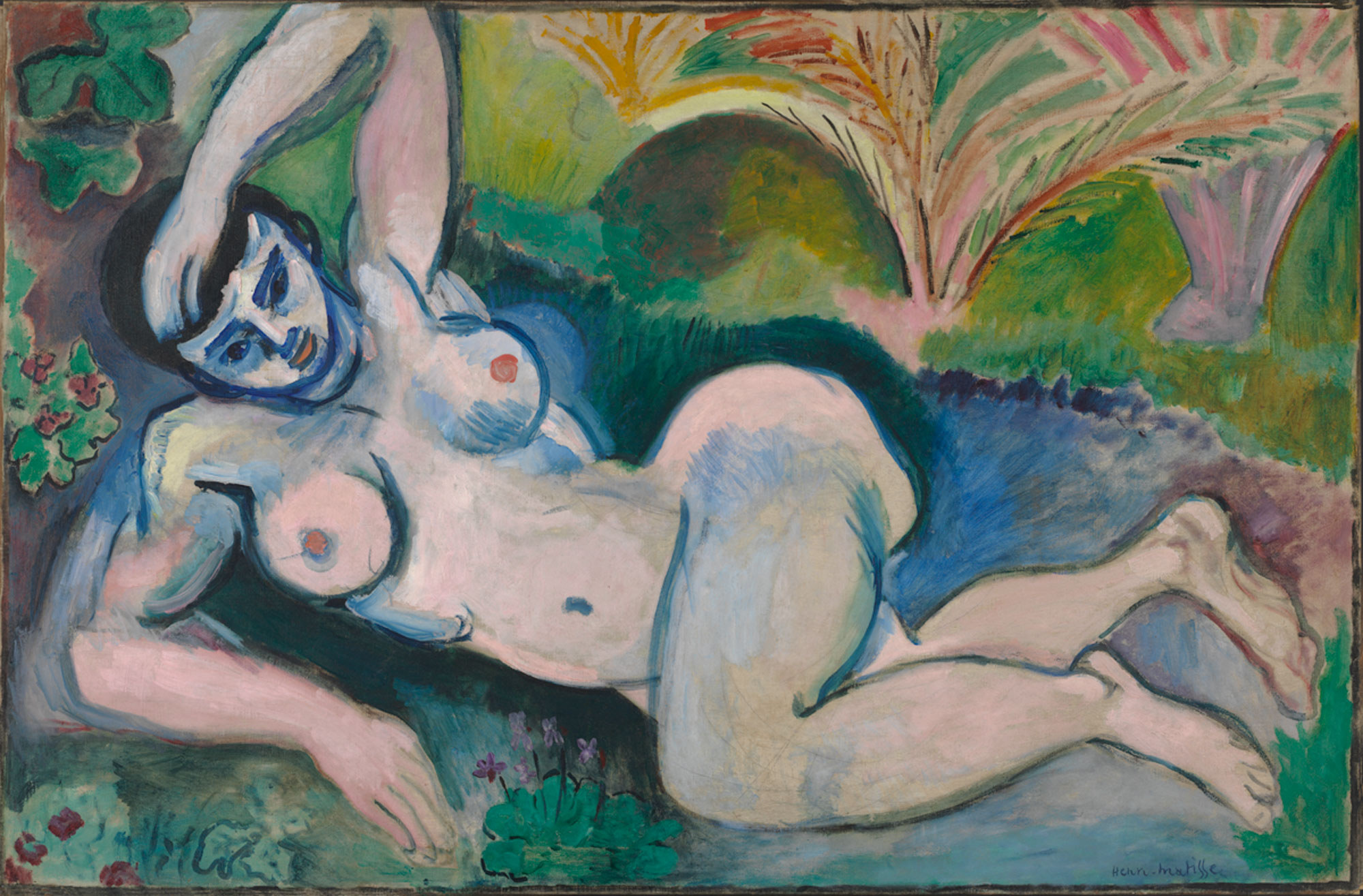
Blue Nude, 1907, Baltimore Museum of Art, Baltimore, Maryland

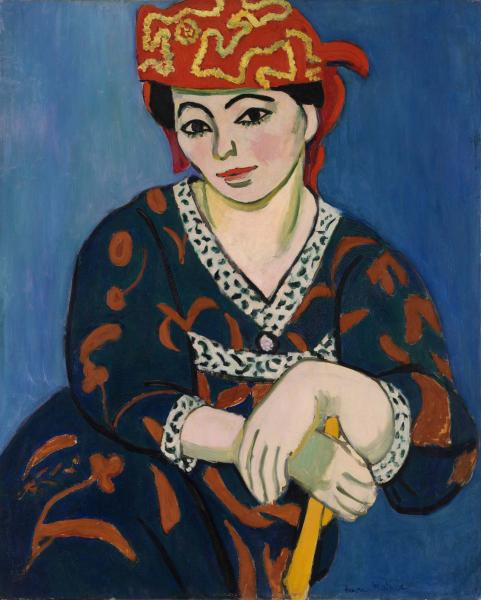
Madras Rouge, The Red Turban, 1907, Barnes Foundation, Philadelphia, Pennsylvania
(Exhibited at the 1913 Armory Show)

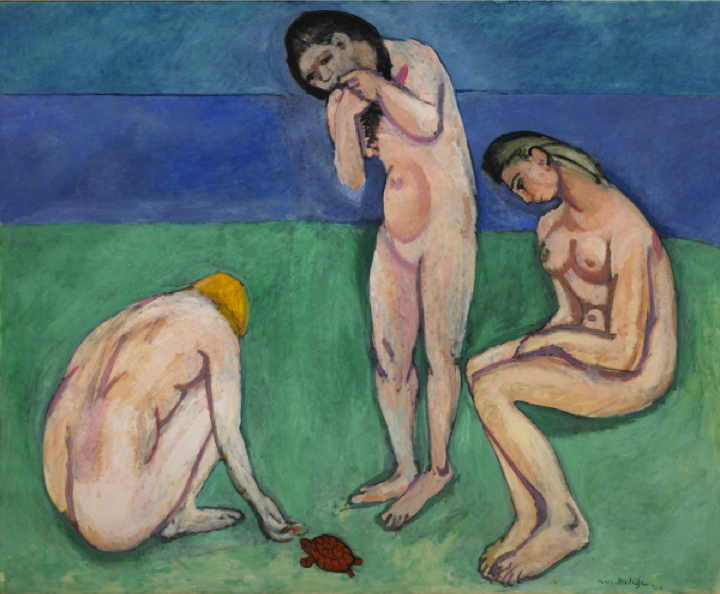
Bathers with a Turtle, 1908, Saint Louis Art Museum, St. Louis

The Dessert: Harmony in Red (The Red Room), 1908, Hermitage Museum, St. Petersburg, Russia

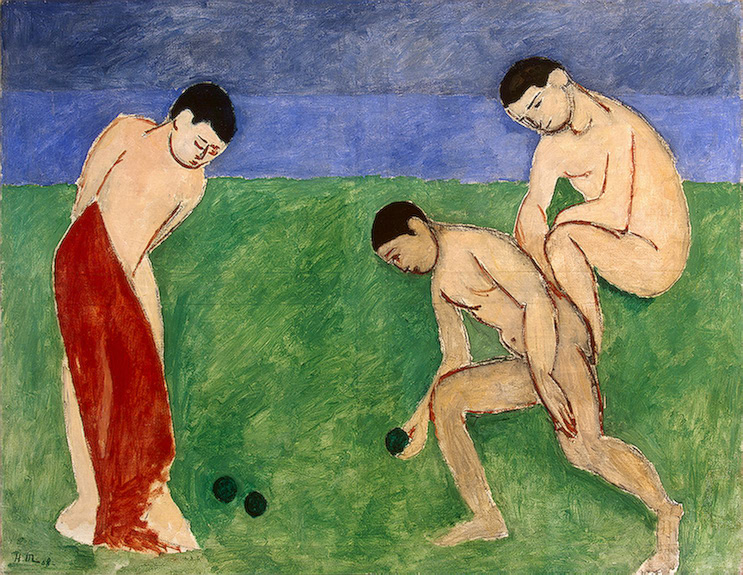
Game of Bowls, 1908, Hermitage Museum, St. Petersburg, Russia

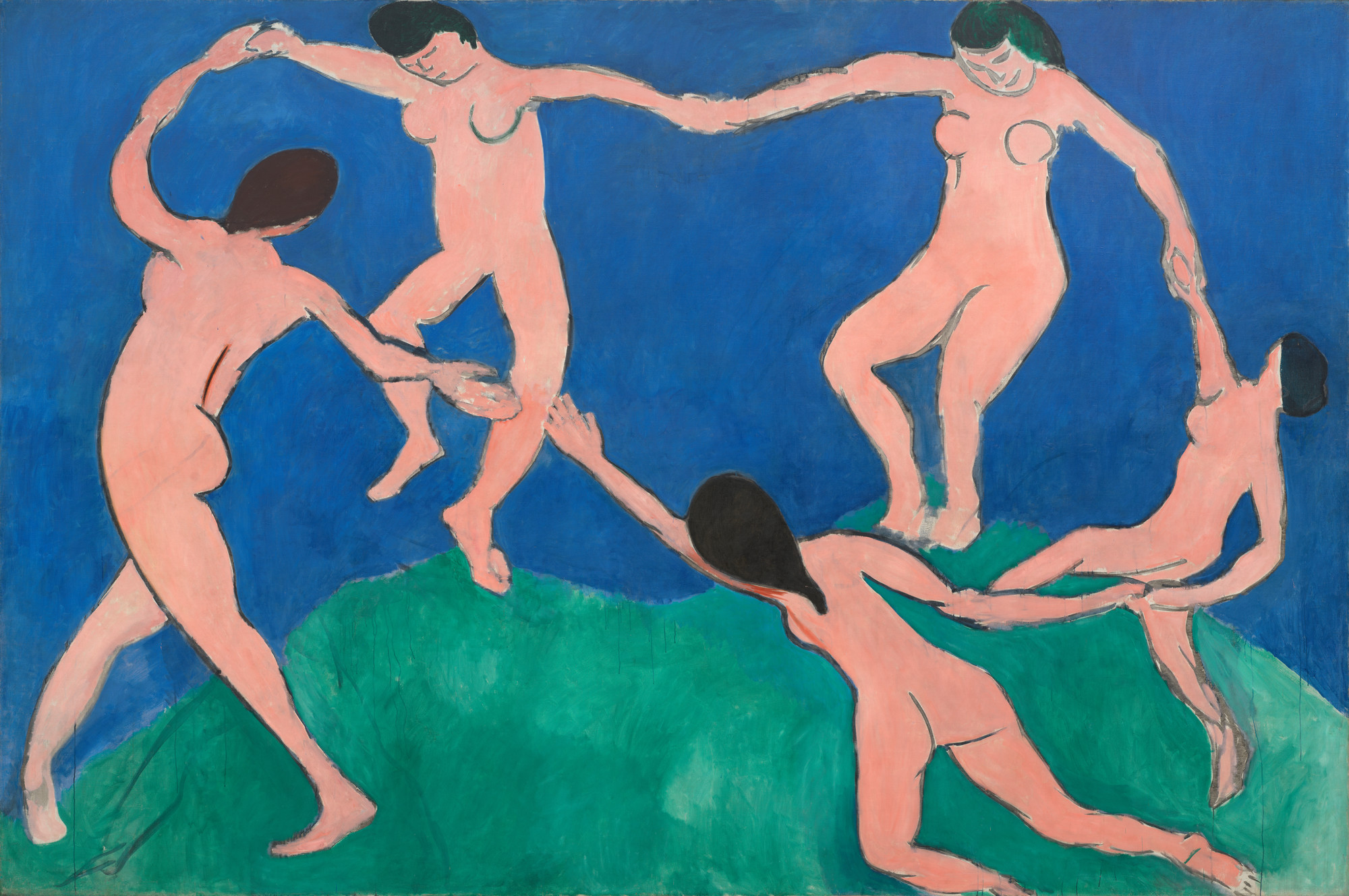
La Danse (first version), 1909, Museum of Modern Art, New York City

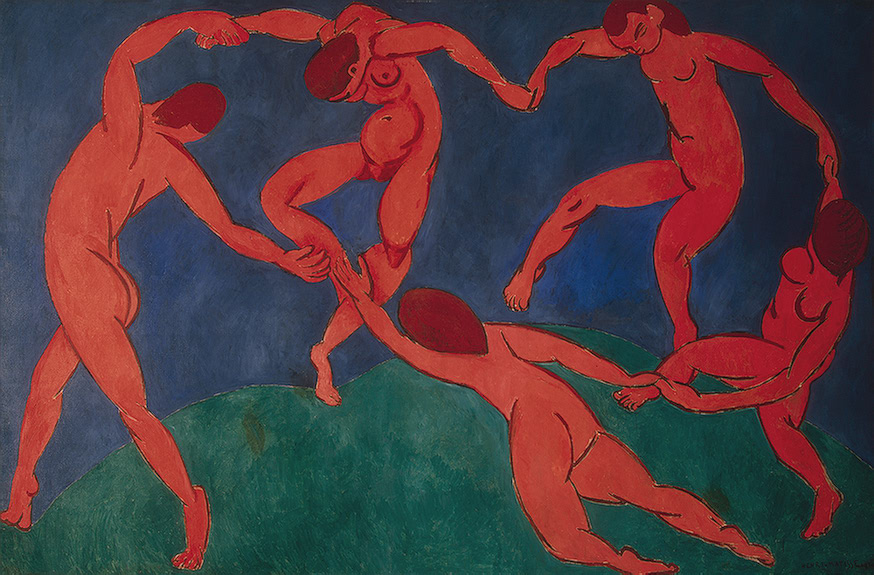
La Danse (second version), 1910, Hermitage Museum, St. Petersburg, Russia

=== Sculpture ===
Le Serf (The Serf, Der Sklave), 1900–1904, bronze

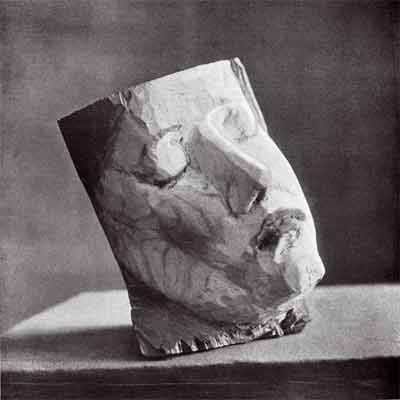
Sleep, 1905, wood, exhibition Blue Rose (Голубая Роза), 1907, location unknown

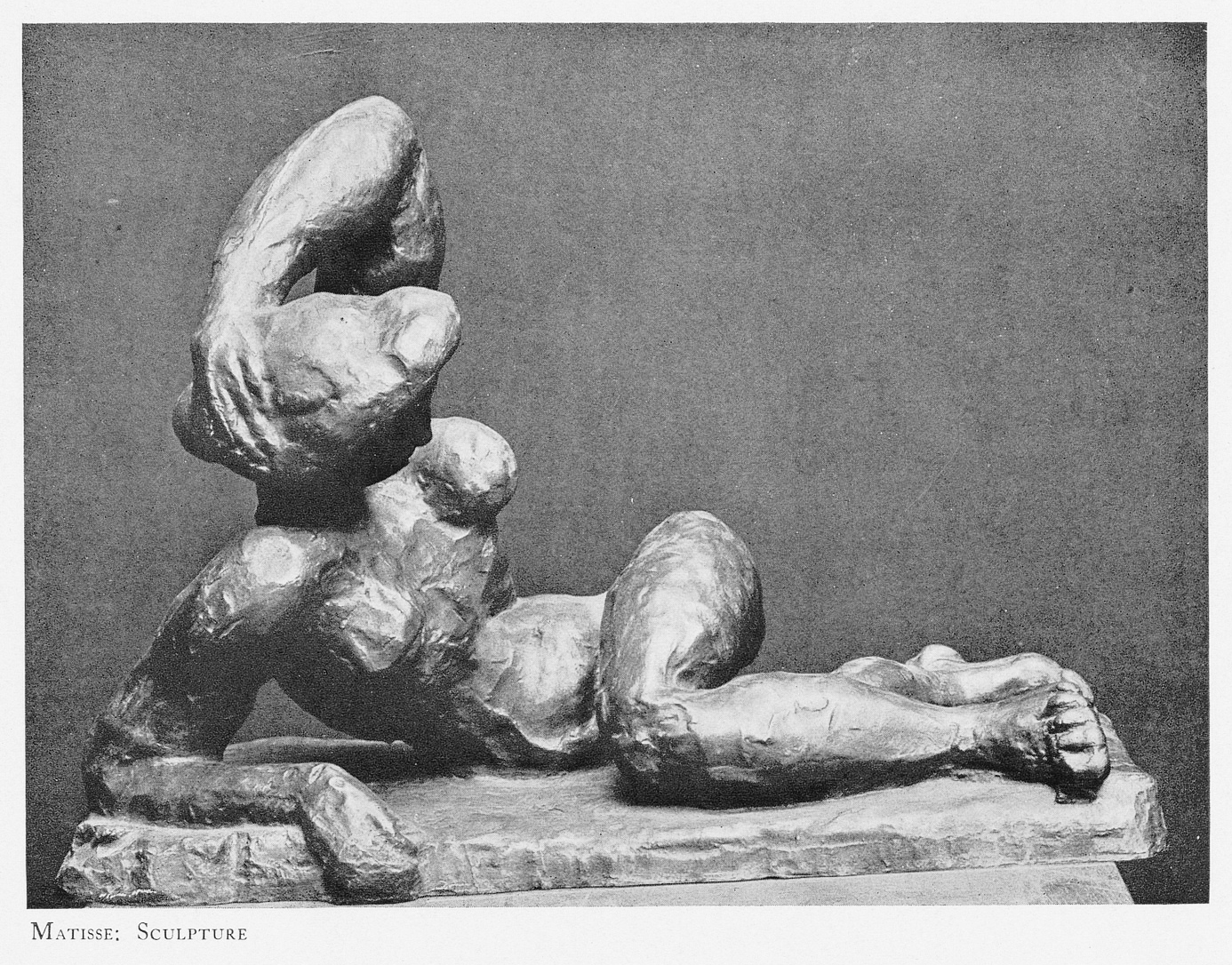
Nu couché, I (Reclining Nude, I), 1906–07, bronze, exhibited at Montross Gallery, New York, 1915

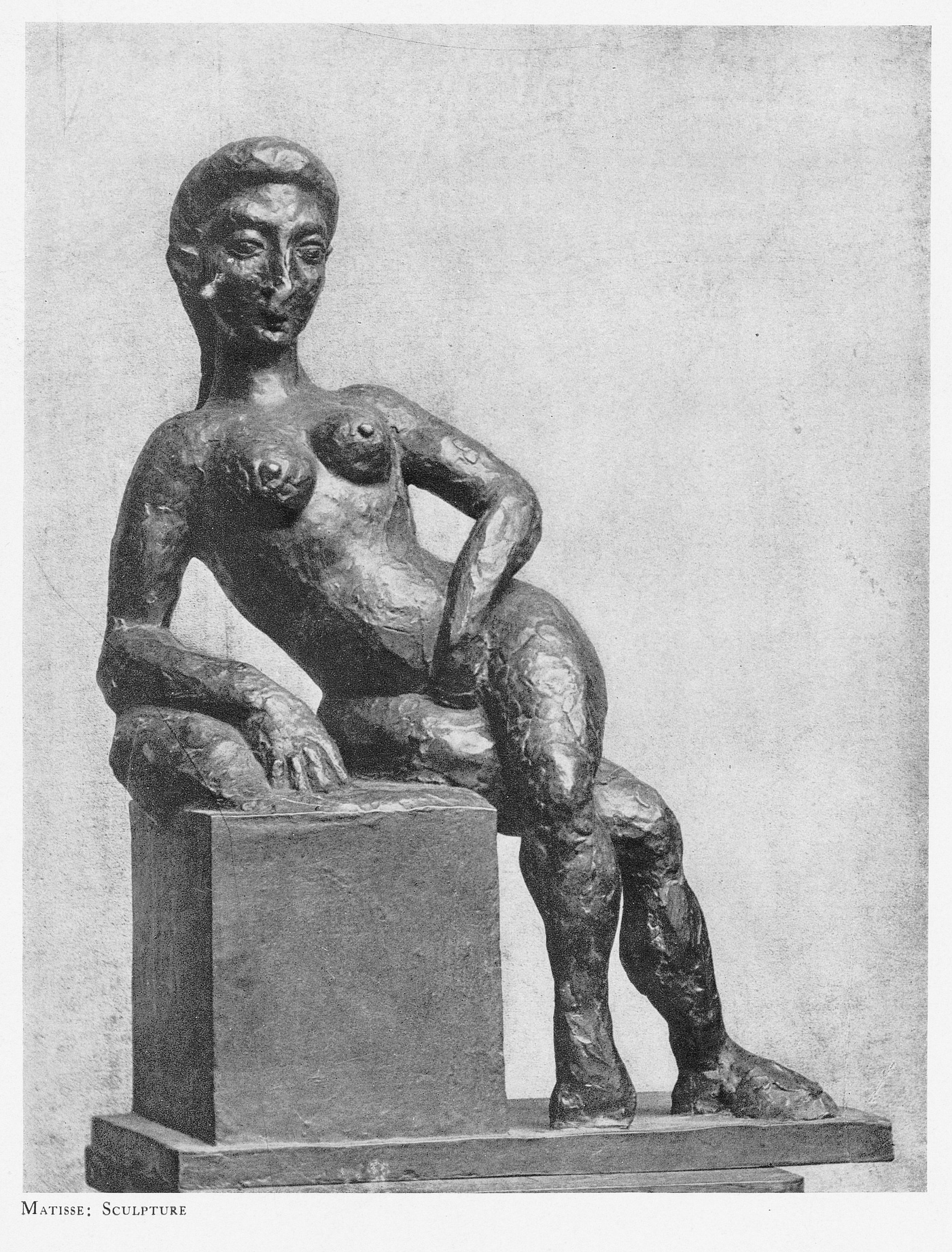
Figure décorative, 1908, bronze

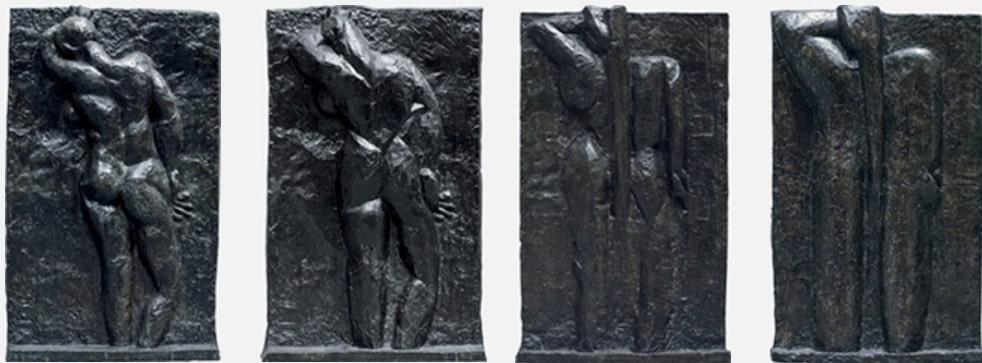
The Back Series, bronze, left to right: The Back I, 1908–09, The Back II, 1913, The Back III 1916, The Back IV, c. 1931, all Museum of Modern Art, New York City

== Gertrude Stein, Académie Matisse, and the Cone sisters ==
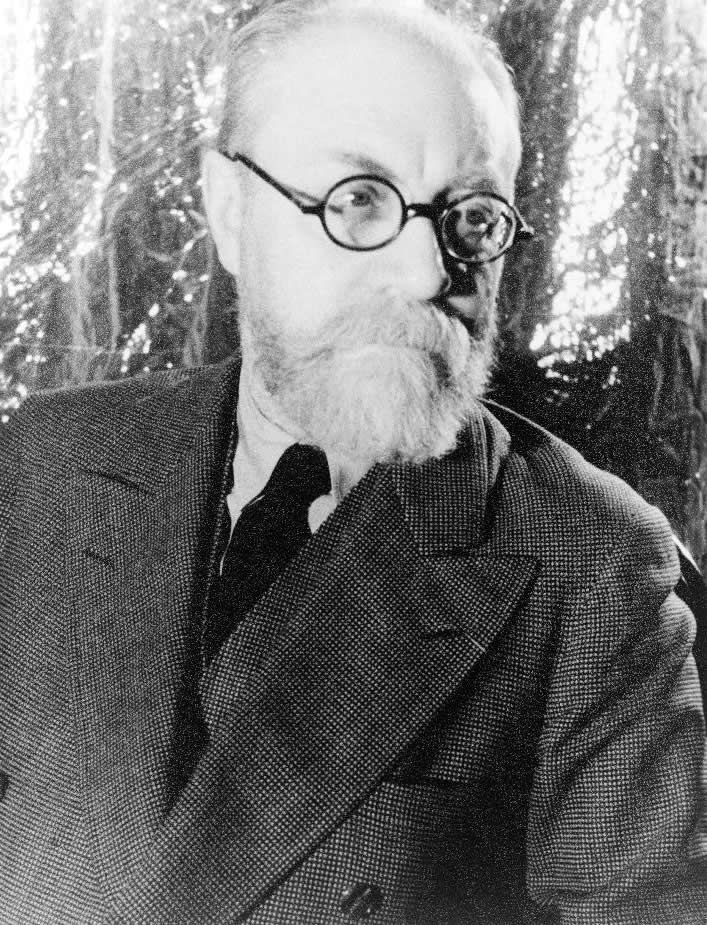
Henri Matisse, 1933, by Carl Van Vechten

Around April 1906, Matisse met Pablo Picasso, who was 11 years his junior. The two became lifelong friends as well as rivals and are often compared. One key difference between them is that Matisse drew and painted from nature, while Picasso was more inclined to work from imagination. The subjects painted most frequently by both artists were women and still lifes, with Matisse more likely to place his figures in fully realised interiors. Matisse and Picasso were first brought together at the Paris salon of Gertrude Stein with her partner Alice B. Toklas. During the first decade of the twentieth century, the Americans in Paris—Gertrude Stein, her brothers Leo Stein, Michael Stein, and Michael's wife Sarah—were important collectors and supporters of Matisse's paintings. In addition, Gertrude Stein's two American friends from Baltimore, the Cone sisters Claribel and Etta, became major patrons of Matisse and Picasso, collecting hundreds of their paintings and drawings. The Cone collection is now exhibited in the Baltimore Museum of Art.

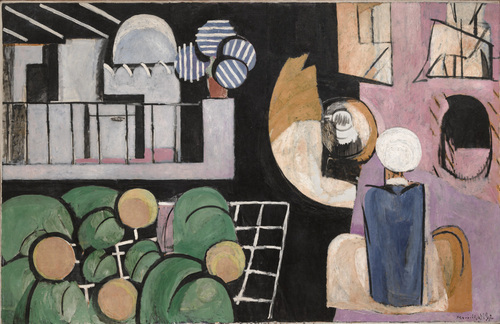
Henri Matisse, The Moroccans, 1915–16, oil on canvas, 181.3 x 279.4 cm, Museum of Modern Art

While numerous artists visited the Stein salon, many of these artists were not represented among the paintings on the walls at 27 rue de Fleurus. Where the works of Renoir, Cézanne, Matisse, and Picasso dominated Leo and Gertrude Stein's collection, Sarah Stein's collection particularly emphasised Matisse.

Contemporaries of Leo and Gertrude Stein, Matisse and Picasso became part of their social circle and routinely joined the gatherings that took place on Saturday evenings at 27 rue de Fleurus. Gertrude attributed the beginnings of the Saturday evening salons to Matisse, remarking, "More and more frequently, people began visiting to see the Matisse paintings [...] Matisse brought people, everybody brought somebody, and they came at any time and it began to be a nuisance".

Among Pablo Picasso's acquaintances who also frequented the Saturday evenings were Fernande Olivier (Picasso's mistress), Georges Braque, André Derain, the poets Max Jacob and Guillaume Apollinaire, Marie Laurencin (Apollinaire's mistress and an artist in her own right), and Henri Rousseau.

His friends organized and financed the Académie Matisse in Paris, a private and non-commercial school in which Matisse instructed young artists. It operated from 1907 until 1911. The initiative for the academy came from the Steins and the Dômiers, with the involvement of Hans Purrmann, Patrick Henry Bruce, and Sarah Stein.

Matisse spent seven months in Morocco from 1912 to 1913, producing about 24 paintings and numerous drawings. His frequent orientalist topics of later paintings, such as odalisques, can be traced to this period. Goldfish in aquariums also became a frequently recurring theme in Matisse's art following his trip to Morocco.

=== Selected works (1910–1917) ===
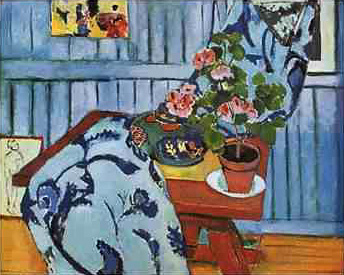
Still Life with Geraniums, 1910, Pinakothek der Moderne, Munich, Germany

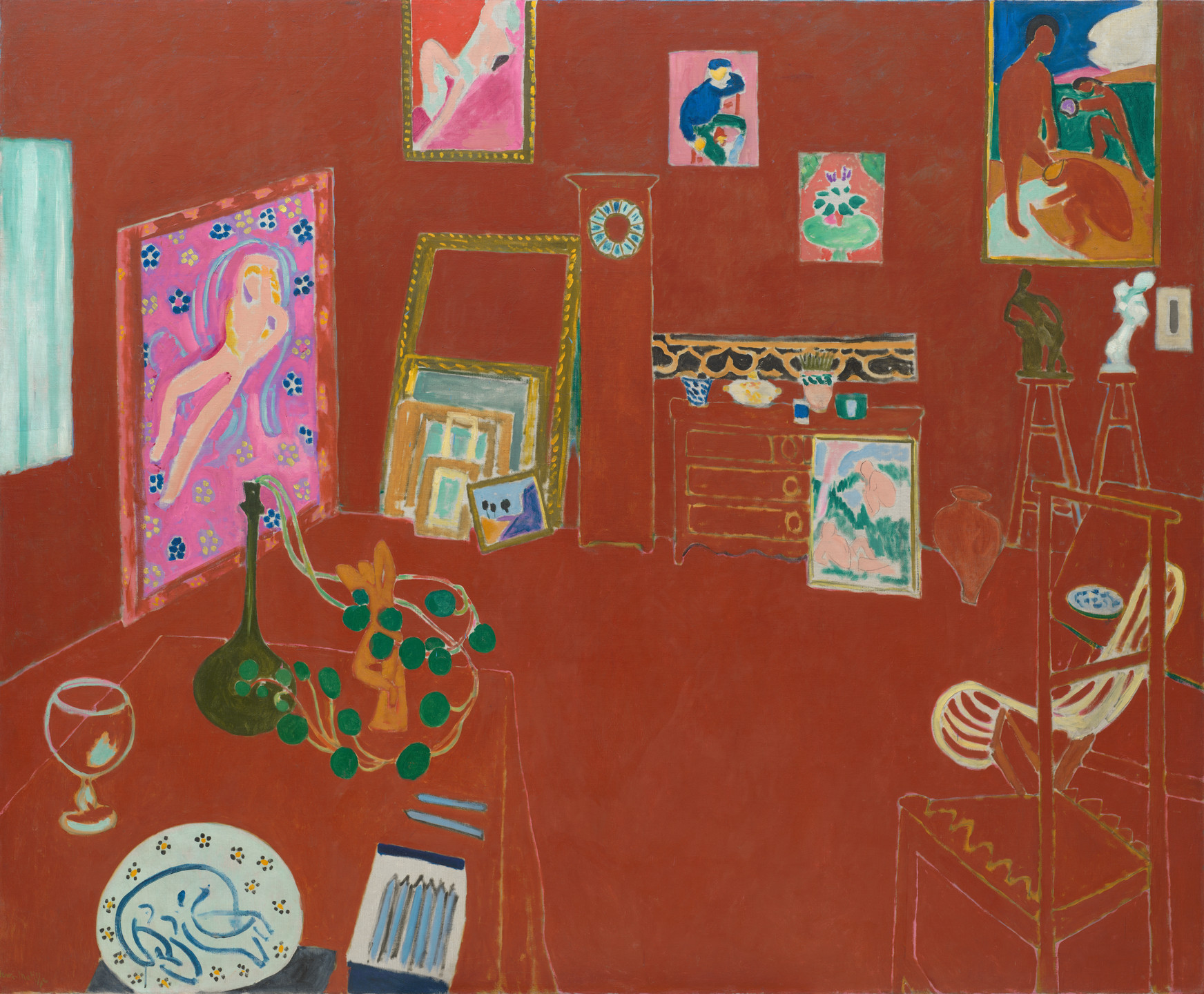
L'Atelier Rouge, 1911, The Museum of Modern Art, New York City

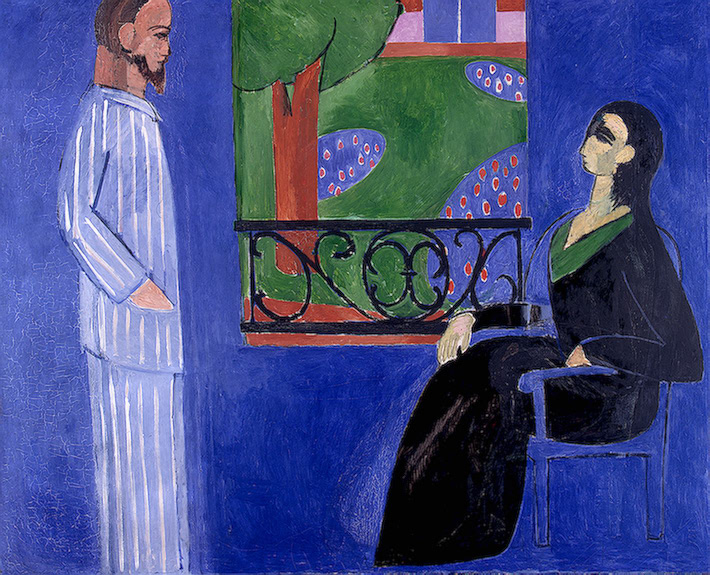
The Conversation, c. 1911, The Hermitage, St. Petersburg, Russia

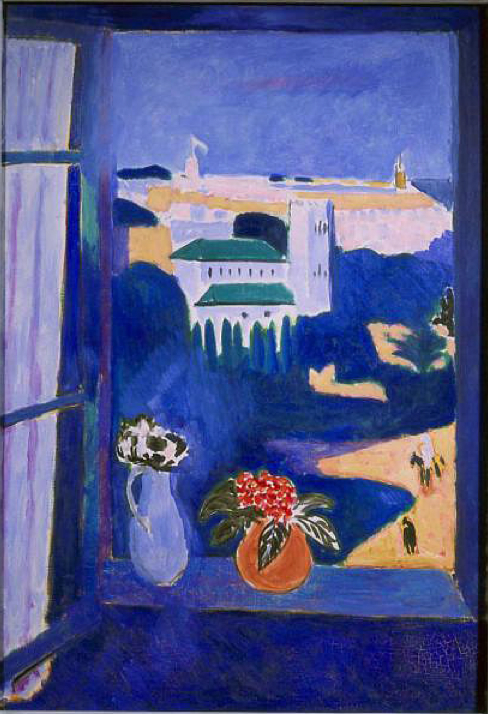
Window at Tangier, 1911–12, The Pushkin Museum of Fine Arts, Moscow

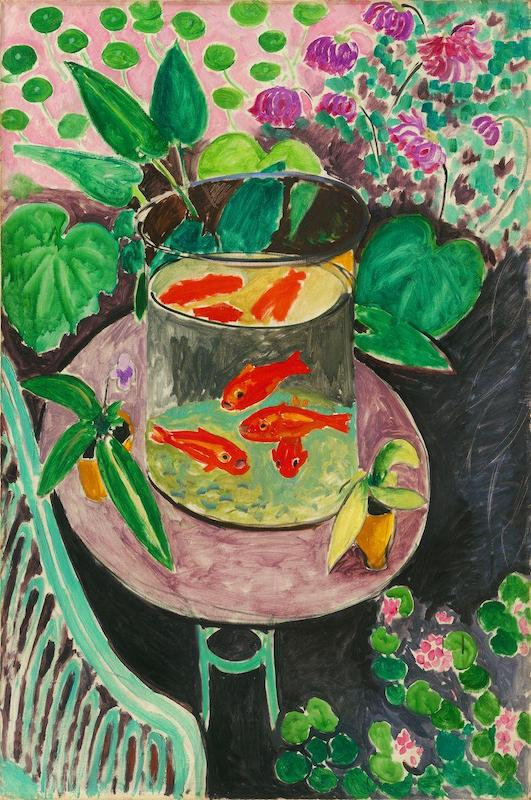
Goldfish, 1912, Pushkin Museum of Fine Arts, Moscow

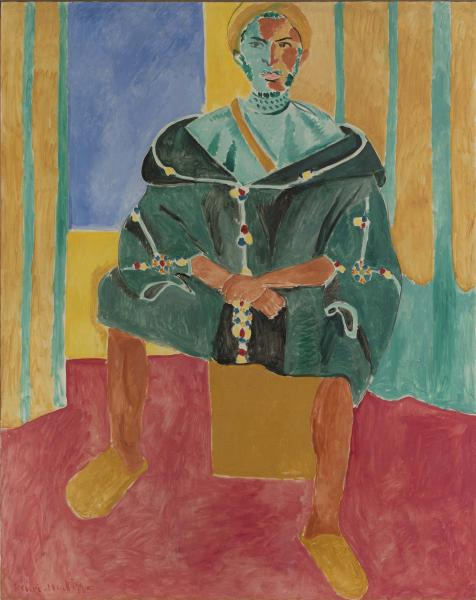
Le Rifain assis, 1912–13, 200 × 160 cm. Barnes Foundation

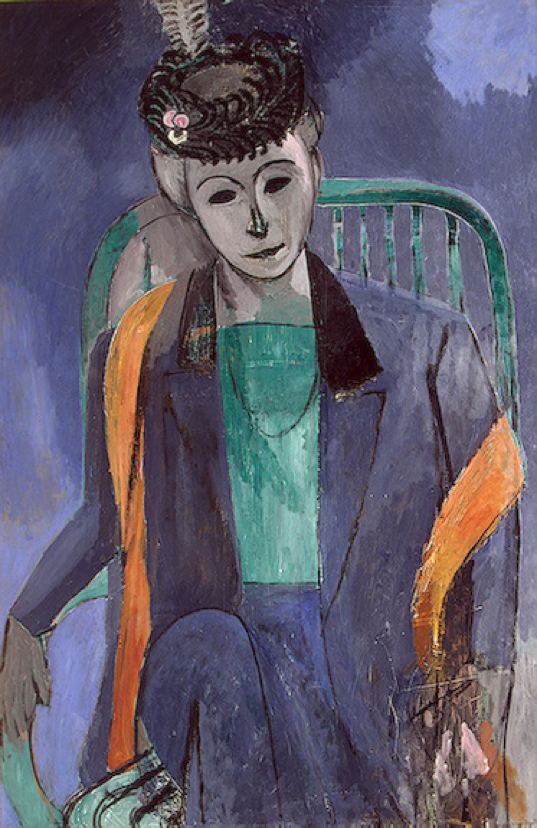
Portrait of the Artist's Wife, 1913, Hermitage Museum, Saint Petersburg

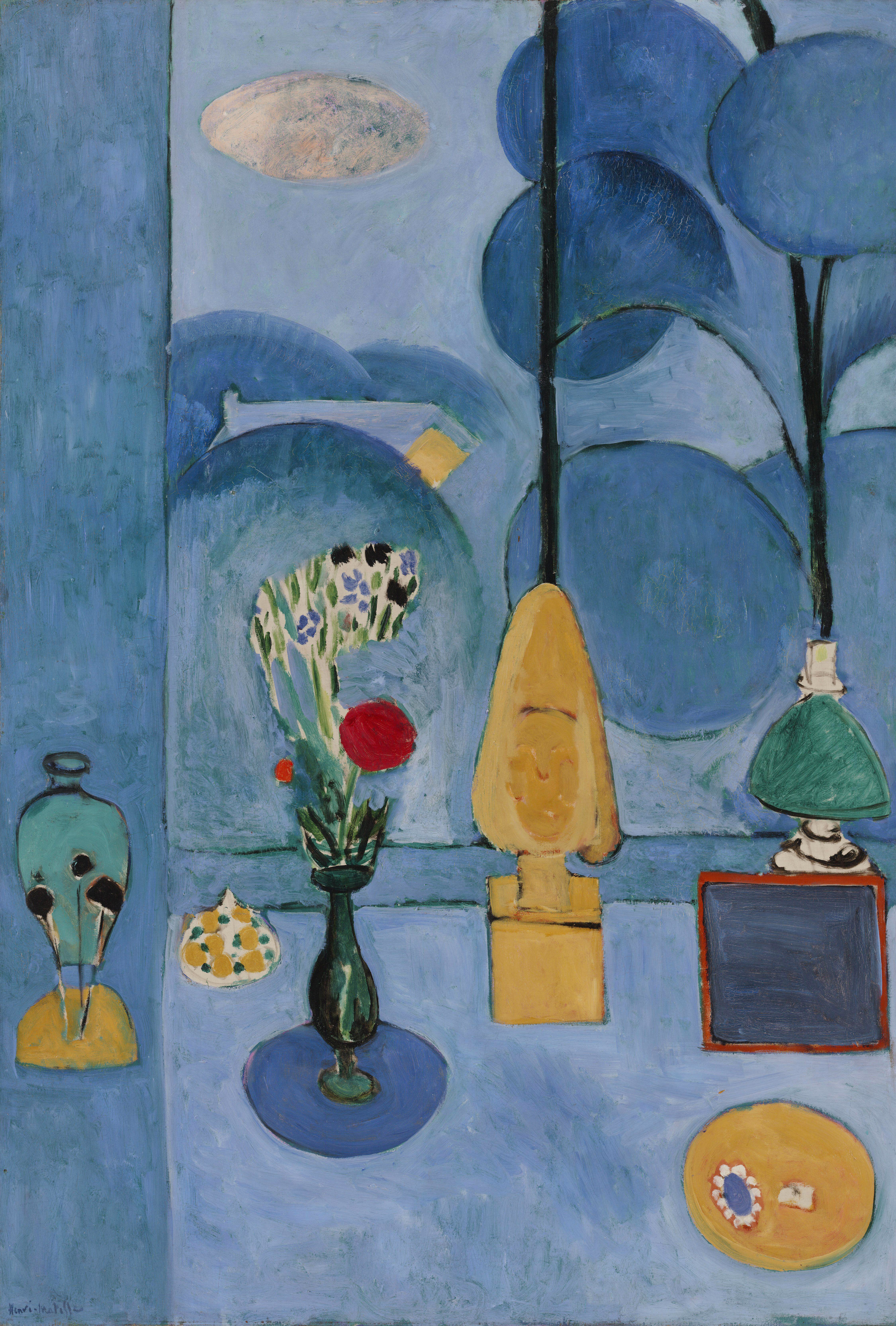
La glace sans tain (The Blue Window), 1913, Museum of Modern Art

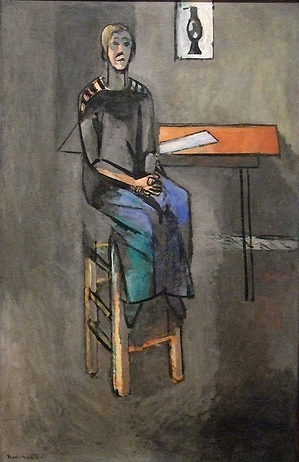
Woman on a High Stool, 1914, Museum of Modern Art, New York City

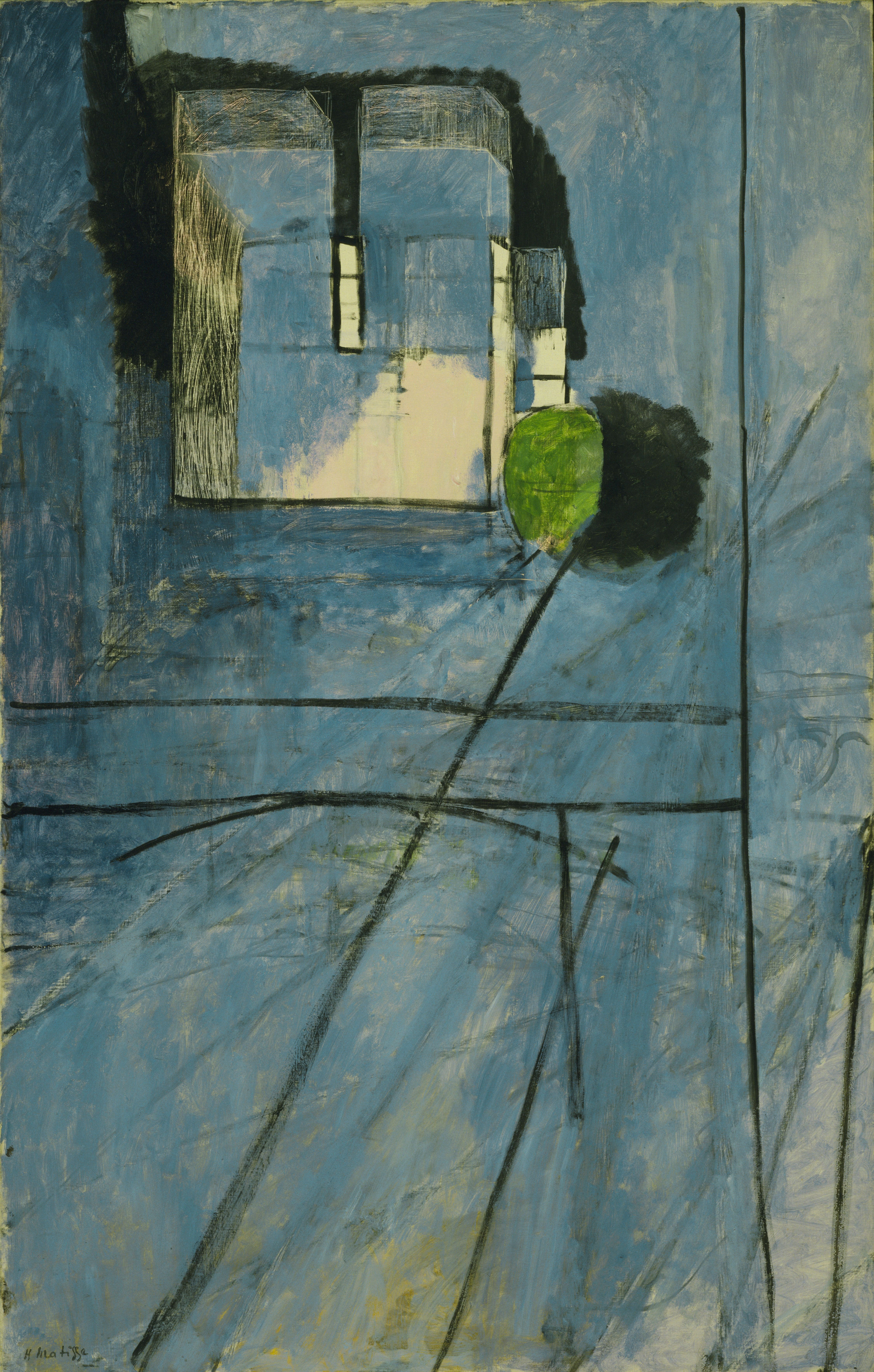
View of Notre-Dame, 1914, Museum of Modern Art

French Window at Collioure, 1914. Musée National d'Art Moderne, Paris

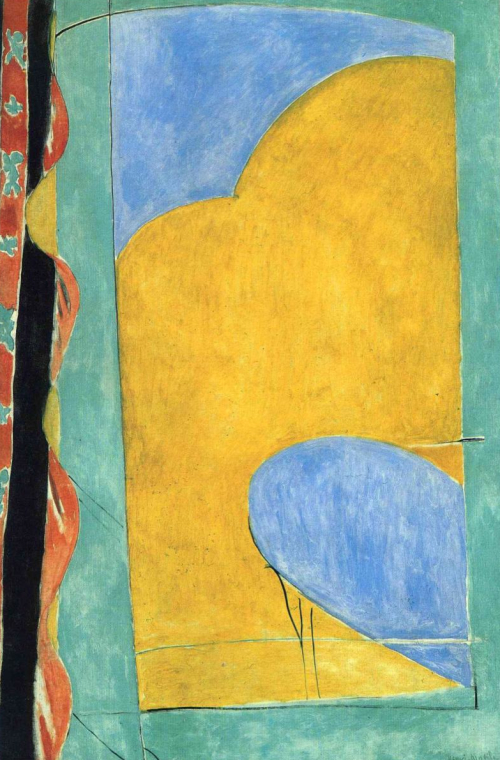
The Yellow Curtain, 1915, Museum of Modern Art, New York

Studio, Quad Saint Michel, 1916, The Phillips Collection

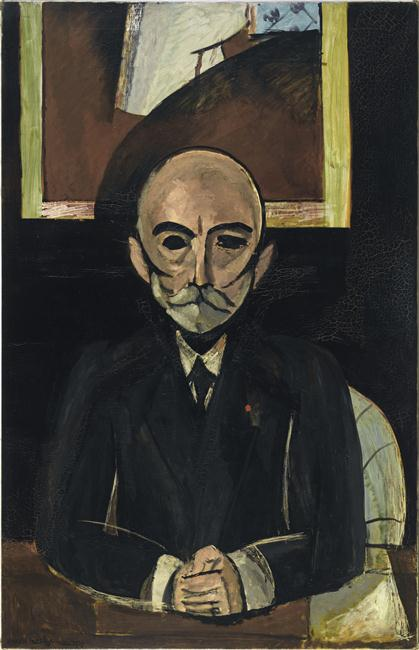
Auguste Pellerin II, 1916–17, Musée National d'Art Moderne, Paris

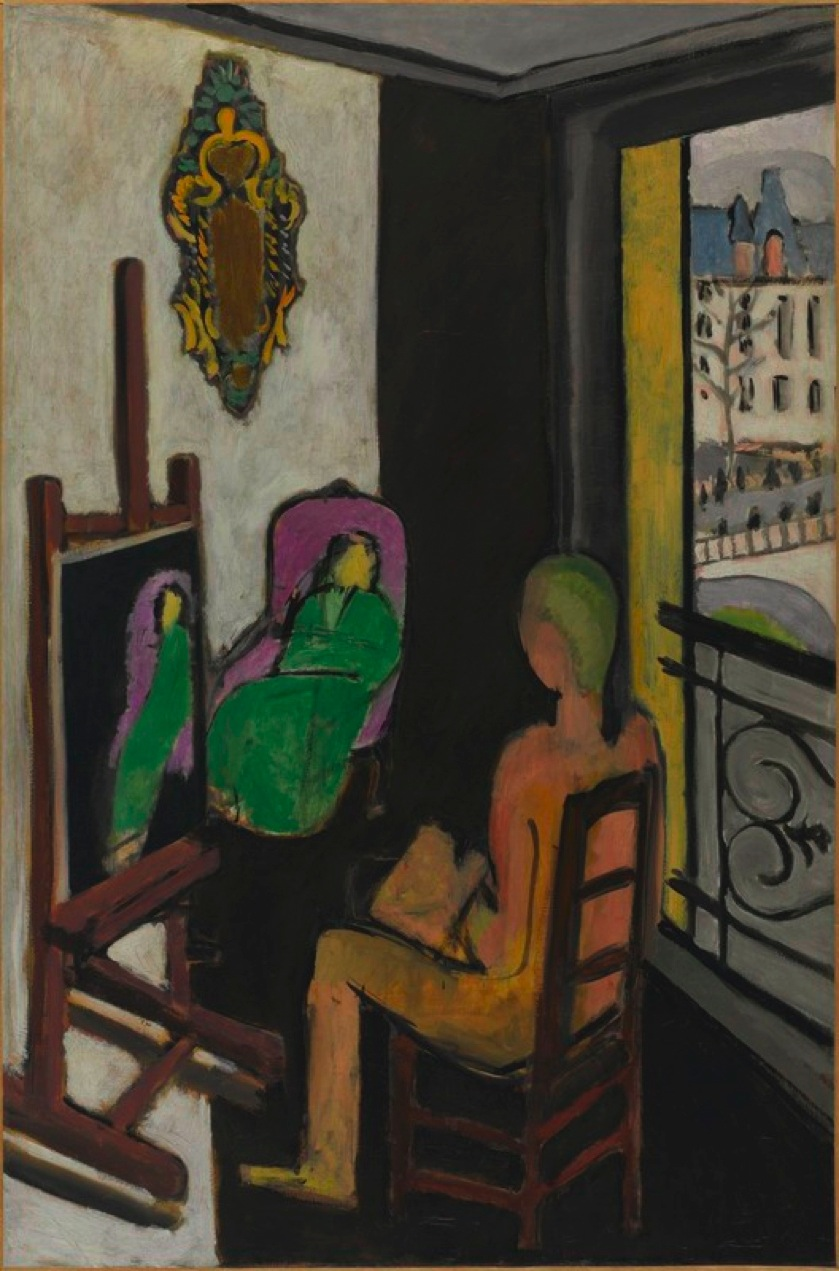
The Painter and His Model (Le Peintre dans son atelier), 1916–17, Musée National d'Art Moderne, Paris

Portrait de famille (The Music Lesson), 1917, oil on canvas, 245.1 x 210.8 cm, Barnes Foundation

== After Paris ==
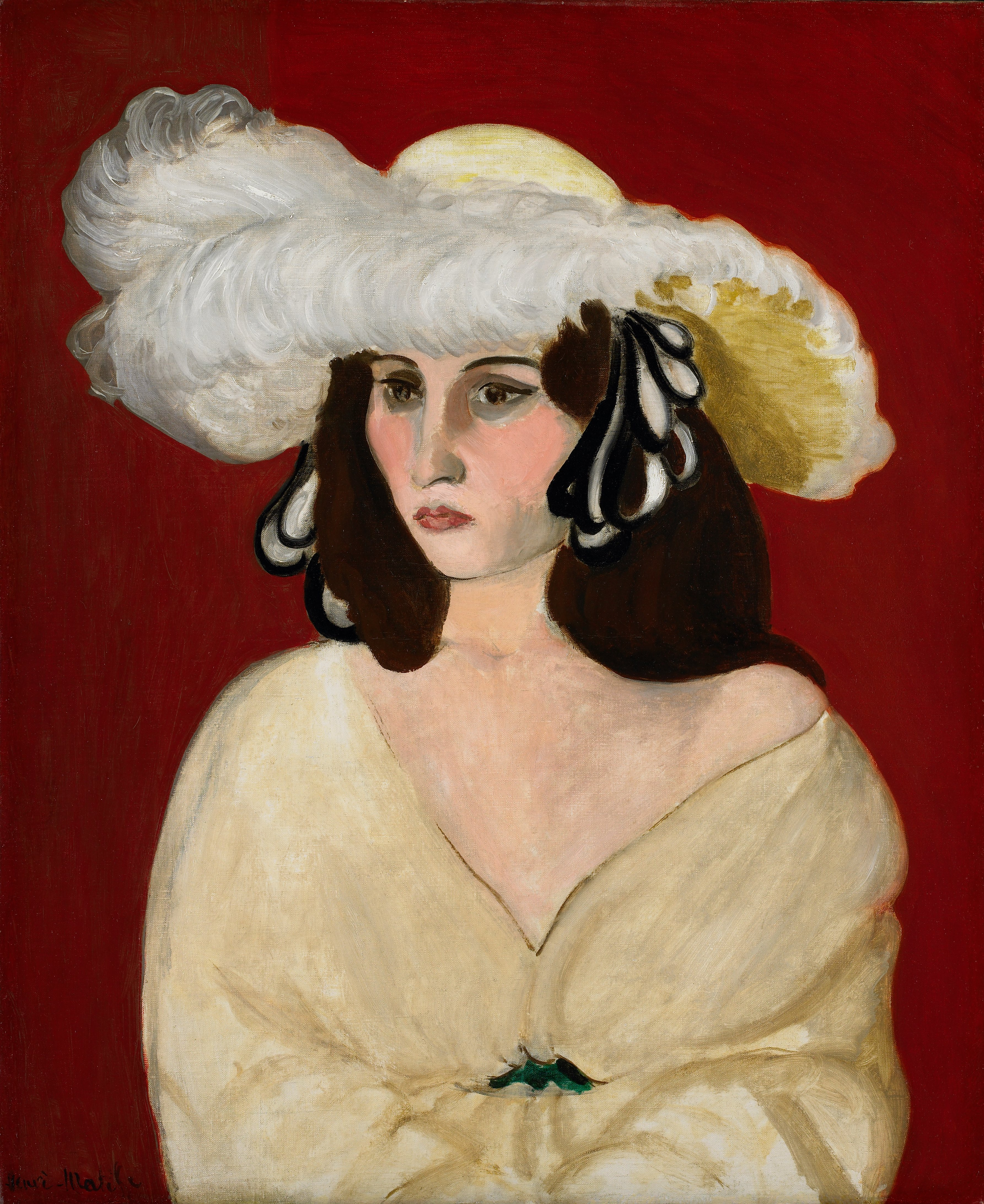
White Plumes, 1919. Minneapolis Institute of Art

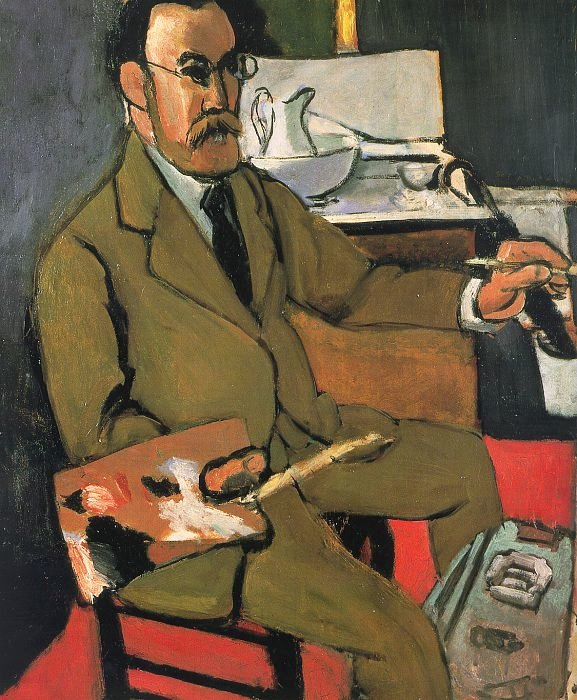
Self-portrait, 1918, Matisse Museum (Le Cateau)

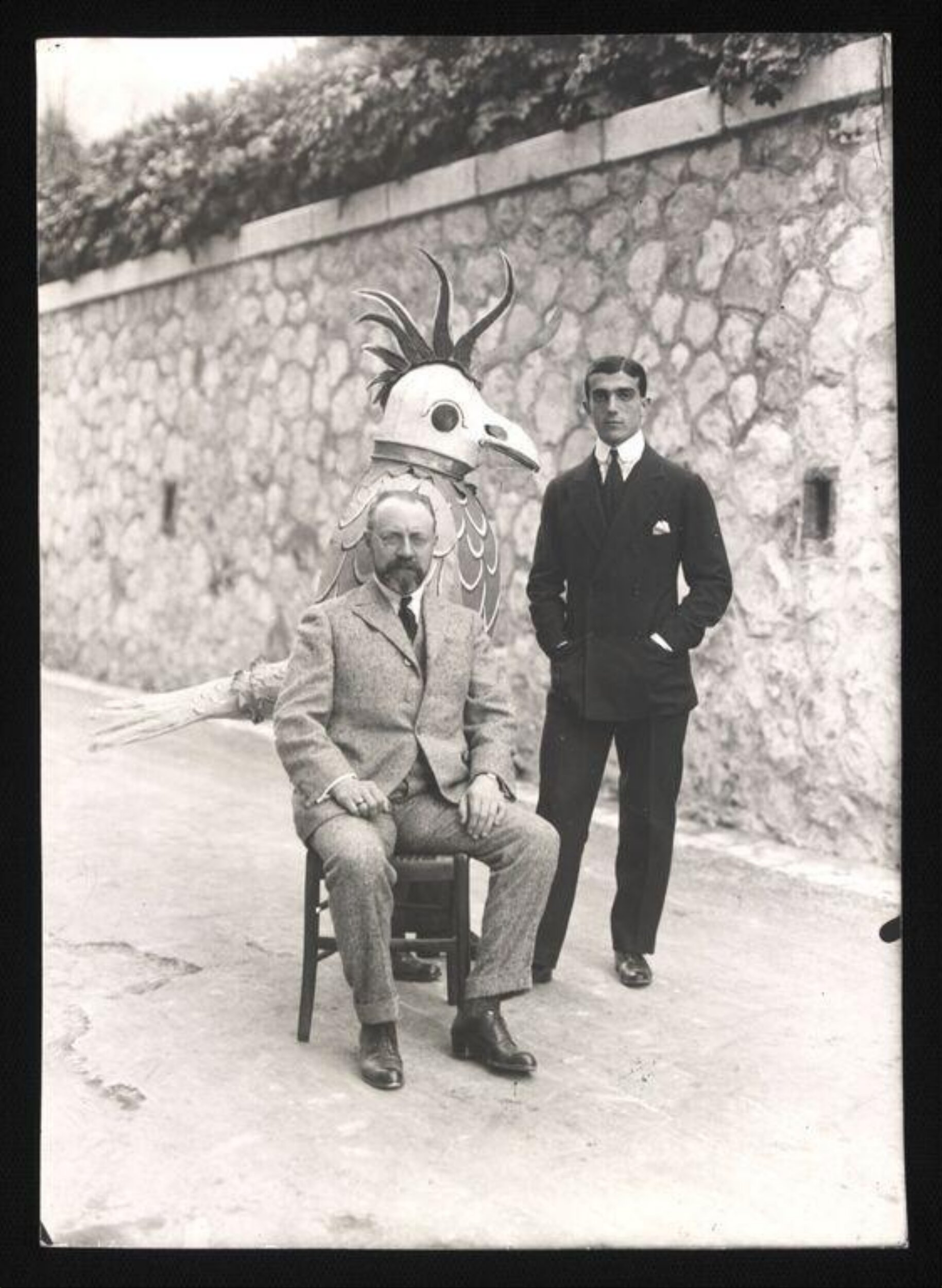
Matisse with Léonide Massine preparing Le chant du rossignol. The ballet debut occurred on 2 February 1920 at the Théâtre National de l'Opéra in Paris. Massine did the choreography and Matisse the sets, costumes and curtain designs.

Le Chant du Rossignol, Tamara Karsavina with dancers. Costume designs by Matisse, 1920

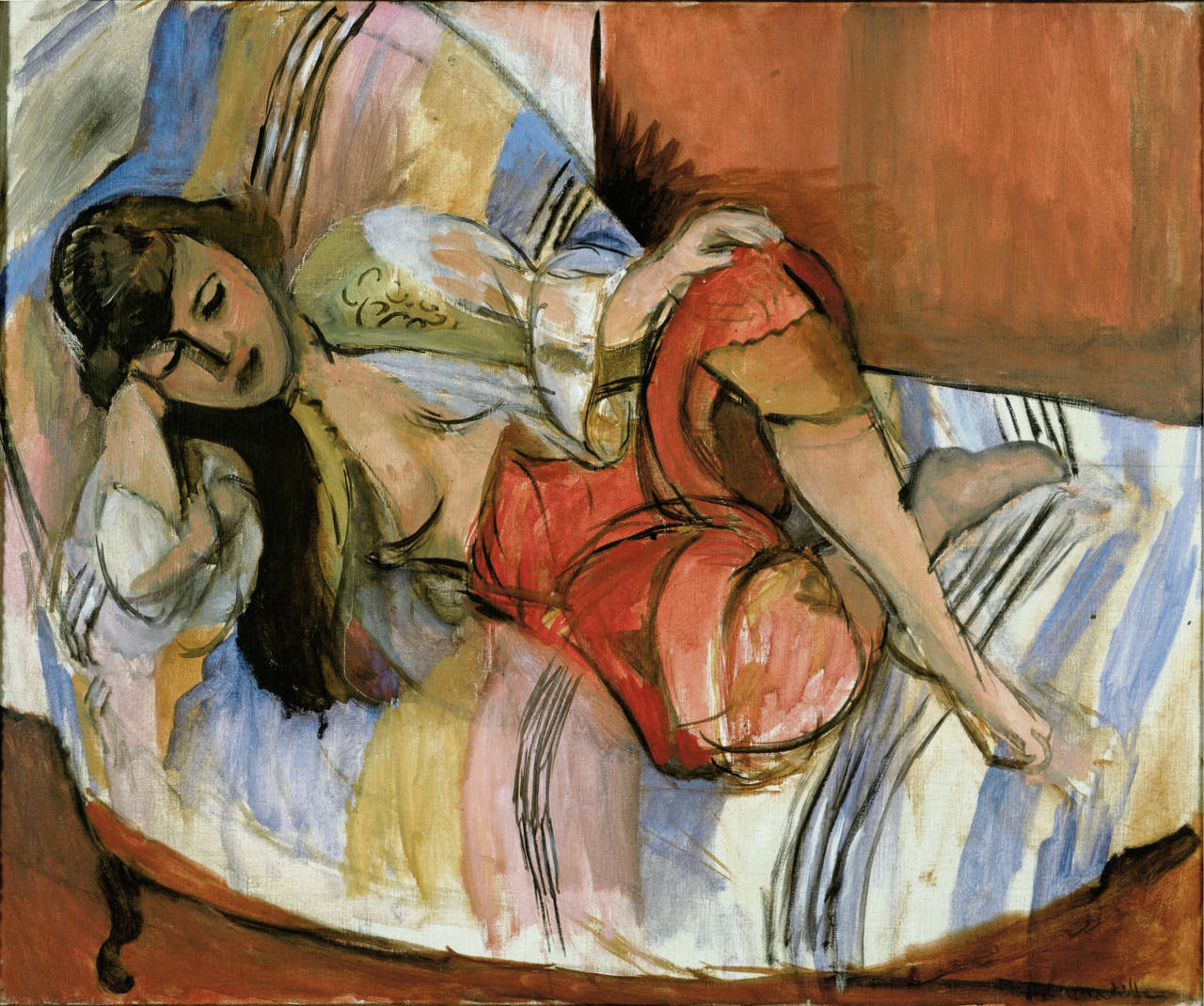
Odalisque, 1920–21, oil on canvas, 61.4 x 74.4 cm, Stedelijk Museum

In 1917, Matisse relocated to Cimiez on the French Riviera, a suburb of the city of Nice. His work of the decade or so following this relocation shows a relaxation and softening of his approach. This "return to order" is characteristic of much post-World War I art, and can be compared with the neoclassicism of Picasso and Stravinsky as well as the return to traditionalism of Derain. Matisse's orientalist odalisque paintings are characteristic of the period; while this work was popular, some contemporary critics found it shallow and decorative.

In the late 1920s, Matisse once again engaged in active collaborations with other artists. He worked with not only Frenchmen, Dutch, Germans, and Spaniards, but also a few Americans and recent American immigrants.

After 1930, a new vigor and bolder simplification appeared in his work. American art collector Albert C. Barnes convinced Matisse to produce a large mural for the Barnes Foundation, The Dance II, which was completed in 1932; the Foundation owns several dozen other Matisse paintings. This move toward simplification and a foreshadowing of the cut-out technique is also evident in his painting Large Reclining Nude (1935). Matisse worked on this painting for several months and documented the progress with a series of 22 photographs, which he sent to Etta Cone.

== World War II years ==
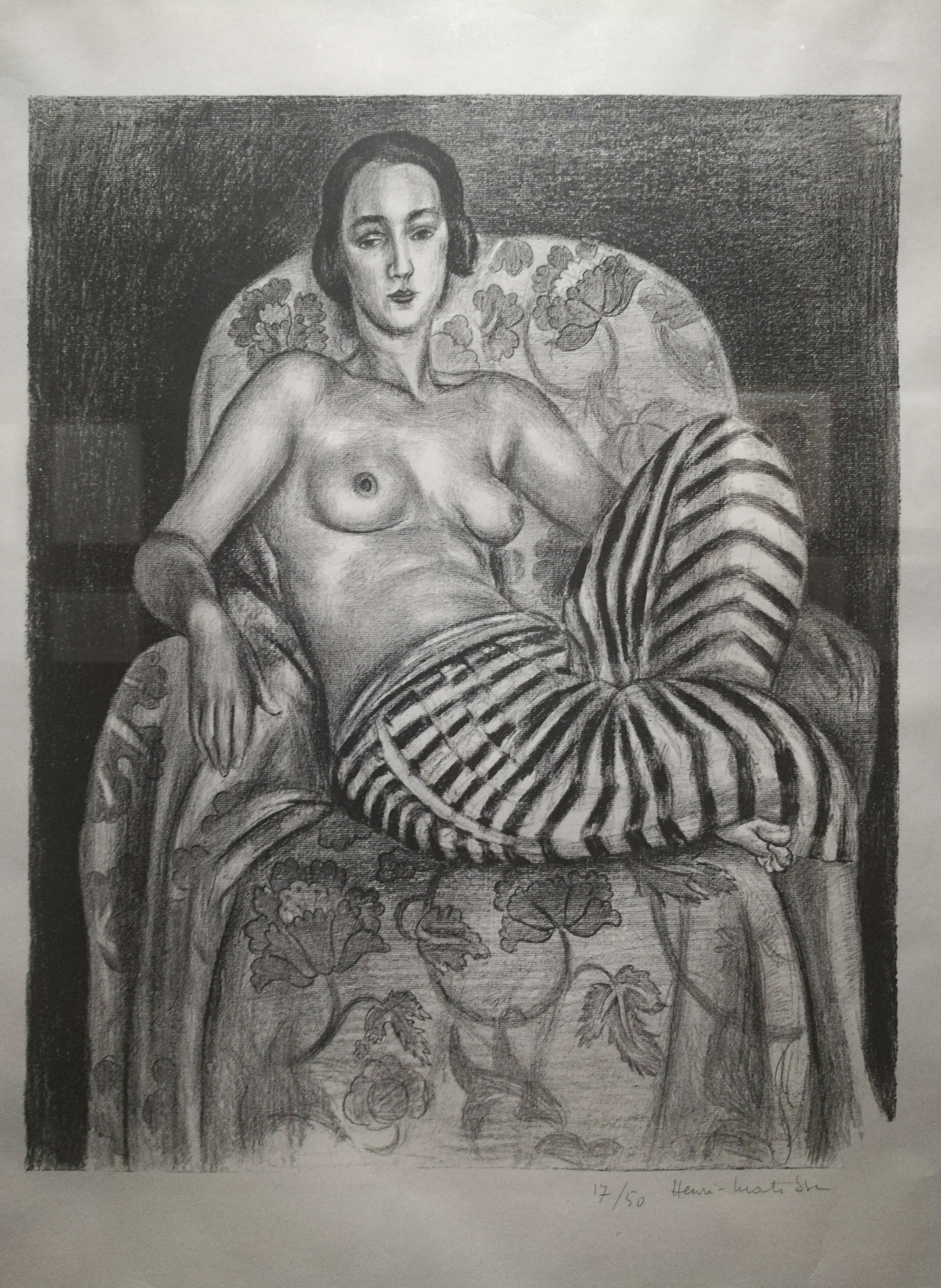
Large odalisque with bayadère breeches (Lithography 1925)

Matisse's wife Amélie, who suspected that he was having an affair with her young Russian emigrée companion, Lydia Delectorskaya, ended their 41-year marriage in July 1939, dividing their possessions equally between them. Delectorskaya attempted suicide by shooting herself in the chest; remarkably, she survived with no serious after-effects, and returned to Matisse and worked with him for the rest of his life, running his household, paying the bills, typing his correspondence, keeping meticulous records, assisting in the studio, and coordinating his business affairs.

Matisse was visiting Paris when the Nazis invaded France in June 1940, but managed to make his way back to Nice. His son, Pierre, by then a gallery owner in New York, begged him to flee while he could. Matisse was about to depart for Brazil to escape the occupation of France but changed his mind and remained in Nice, in Vichy France. In September 1940, he wrote Pierre: "It seemed to me as if I would be deserting. If everyone who has any value leaves France, what remains of France?" Although he was never a member of the resistance, it became a point of pride to the occupied French that one of their most acclaimed artists chose to stay.

While the Nazis occupied France from 1940 to 1944, they were more lenient in their attacks on "degenerate art" in Paris than they were in the German-speaking nations under their military dictatorship. Matisse was allowed to exhibit, along with other former Fauves and Cubists whom Hitler had initially claimed to despise, although without any Jewish artists, all of whose works had been purged from all French museums and galleries; any French artists exhibiting in France had to sign an oath assuring their "Aryan" status, including Matisse. He also worked as a graphic artist and produced black-and-white illustrations for several books and over one hundred original lithographs at the Mourlot Studios in Paris.

In 1941, Matisse was diagnosed with duodenal cancer. The surgery, while successful, resulted in serious complications from which he nearly died. Being bedridden for three months resulted in his developing a new art form using paper and scissors.

That same year, a nursing student named Monique Bourgeois responded to an advertisement placed by Matisse for a nurse. A platonic friendship developed between Matisse and Bourgeois. He discovered that she was an amateur artist and taught her about perspective. After Bourgeois left the position to join a convent in 1944, Matisse sometimes contacted her to request that she model for him. Bourgeois became a Dominican nun in 1946, and Matisse painted a chapel in Vence, a small town he moved to in 1943, in her honor.

Matisse remained, for the most part, isolated in southern France throughout the war, but his family was intimately involved with the French resistance. His son Pierre, the art dealer in New York, helped the Jewish and anti-Nazi French artists he represented to escape occupied France and enter the United States. In 1942, Pierre held an exhibition in New York, "Artists in Exile", which was to become legendary. Matisse's estranged wife, Amélie, was a typist for the French Underground and jailed for six months. Matisse was shocked when he heard that his daughter Marguerite, who had been active in the Résistance during the war, was tortured (almost to death) by the Gestapo in a Rennes prison and sentenced to the Ravensbrück concentration camp in Germany. Marguerite managed to escape from the train to Ravensbrück, which was halted during an Allied air raid; she survived in the woods in the chaos of the closing days of the war until rescued by fellow resisters. Matisse's student Rudolf Levy was killed in the Auschwitz concentration camp in 1944.

== Final years ==
=== Cut-outs ===
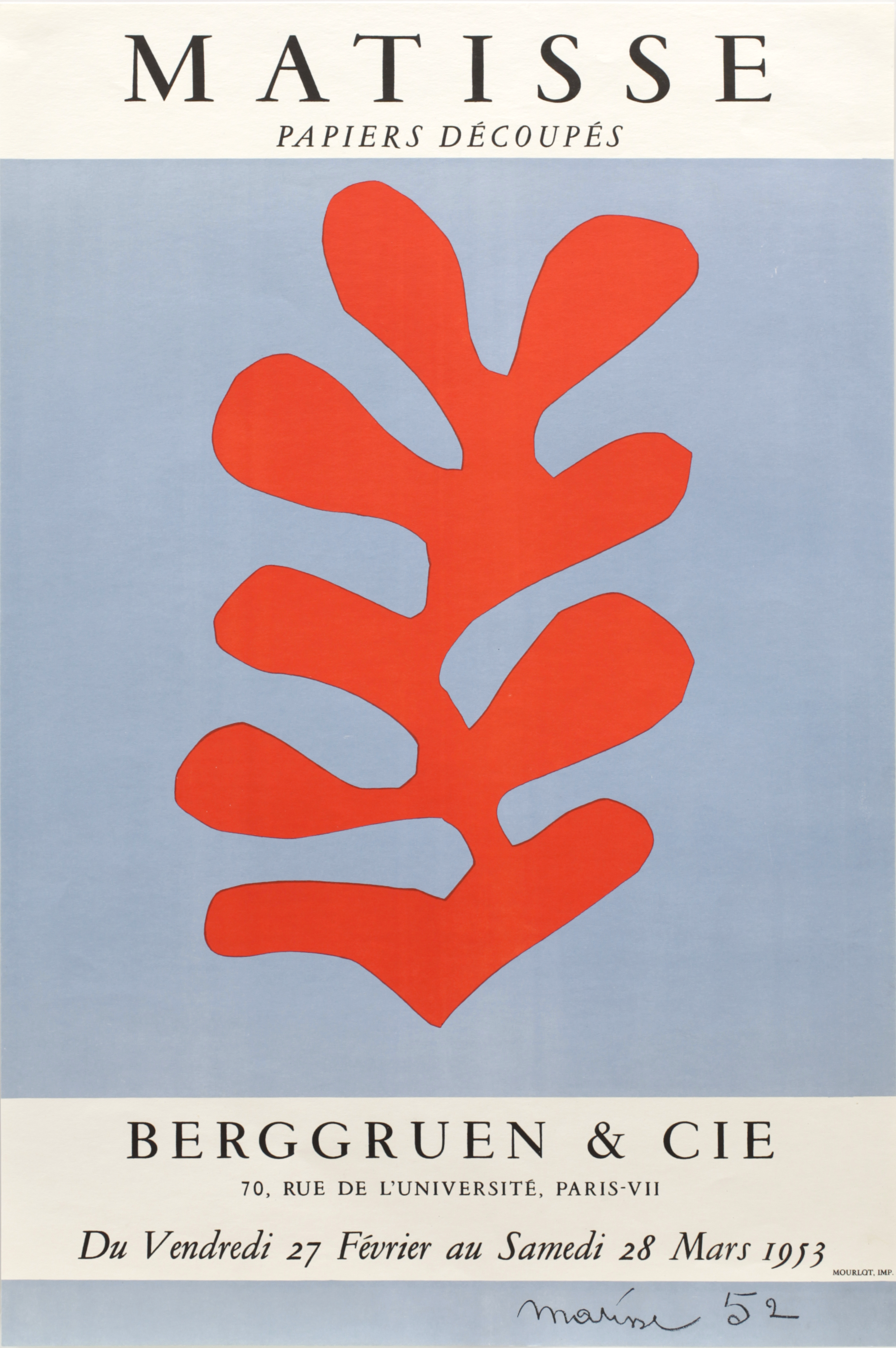
Poster for a Matisse exhibition in Paris 1953, showing a cut-out signed 1952

Diagnosed with abdominal cancer in 1941, Matisse underwent surgery that left him reliant on a wheelchair and often bed bound. Painting and sculpture became physical challenges, so with the help of his assistants, he began creating cut paper collages, or decoupage. He cut sheets of paper, pre-painted with gouache by his assistants, into shapes of varying colours and sizes, and arranged them to form lively compositions. The result was a distinct and dimensional complexity—an art form that was not quite painting, but not quite sculpture. His initial pieces were modest in size, but he eventually developed murals and room-sized works. He referred to his final years as his second life, because while his mobility was limited, he could wander through gardens in the form of his cut-outs.

Although the paper cut-out was Matisse's major medium in the final decade of his life, his first recorded use of the technique was in 1919 during the design of decor for the Le chant du rossignol, an opera composed by Igor Stravinsky. Albert C. Barnes arranged for cardboard templates to be made of the unusual dimensions of the walls onto which Matisse, in his studio in Nice, fixed the composition of painted paper shapes. Another group of cut-outs were made between 1937 and 1938, while Matisse was working on the stage sets and costumes for Sergei Diaghilev's Ballets Russes. However, it was only after his operation that, bedridden, Matisse began to develop the cut-out technique as its own form, rather than its prior utilitarian origin.

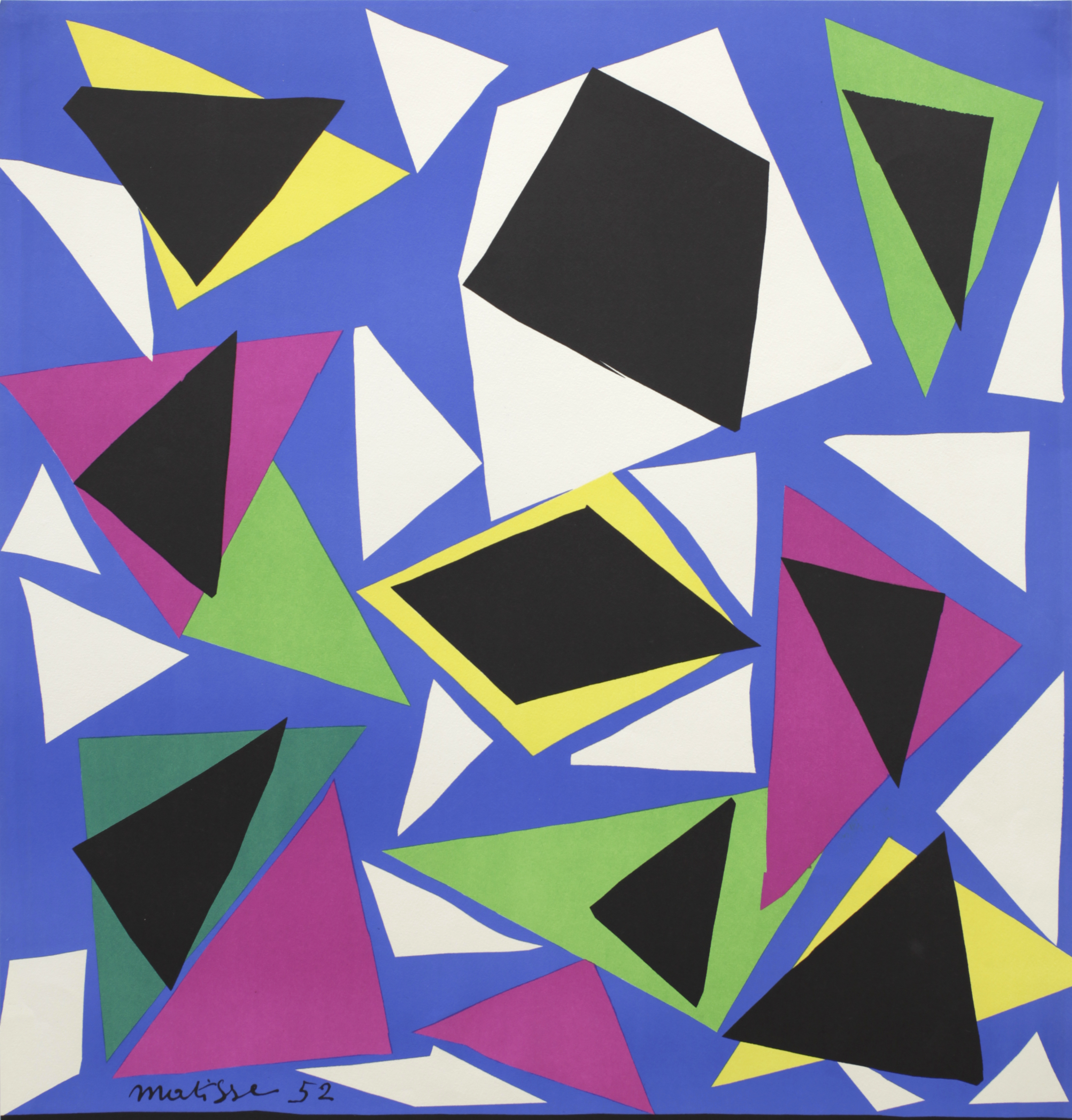
Cut-out, 1952

He moved to the hilltop of Vence, France in 1943, where he produced his first major cut-out project for his artist's book titled Jazz. However, these cut-outs were conceived as designs for stencil prints to be looked at in the book, rather than as independent pictorial works. At this point, Matisse still thought of the cut-outs as separate from his principal art form. His new understanding of this medium unfolds with the 1946 introduction for Jazz. After summarizing his career, Matisse refers to the possibilities the cut-out technique offers, insisting "An artist must never be a prisoner of himself, prisoner of a style, prisoner of a reputation, prisoner of success…"

The number of independently conceived cut-outs steadily increased following Jazz, and eventually led to the creation of mural-size works, such as Oceania the Sky and Oceania the Sea of 1946. Under Matisse's direction, Lydia Delectorskaya, his studio assistant, loosely pinned the silhouettes of birds, fish, and marine vegetation directly onto the walls of the room. The two Oceania pieces, his first cut-outs of this scale, evoked a trip to Tahiti he made years before.

In May 1954, his cut out The Sheaf was exhibited at the Salon de Mai and met with success. The artwork was a commission for American collectors Sidney and Frances Brody and the cut out was then adapted to a ceramic for their house in Los Angeles. It is now located in the Los Angeles County Museum of Art.

=== Chapel and museum ===
In 1948, Matisse began to prepare designs for the Chapelle du Rosaire de Vence, which allowed him to expand this technique within a truly decorative context. The experience of designing the chapel windows, chasubles, and tabernacle door—all planned using the cut-out method—had the effect of consolidating the medium as his primary focus. (His drawings for the Chapel are the subject of an exhibition Matisse in Vence: The Stations of the Cross (March 29, 2026 – June 28, 2026) at the Baltimore Museum of Art.) Finishing his last painting in 1951 (and final sculpture the year before), Matisse utilized the paper cut-out as his sole medium for expression up until his death.

In 1952, Matisse established a museum dedicated to his work, the Matisse Museum in Le Cateau, and this museum is now the third-largest collection of Matisse works in France.

According to David Rockefeller, Matisse's final work was the design for a stained-glass window installed at the Union Church of Pocantico Hills near the Rockefeller estate north of New York City: "It was his final artistic creation; the maquette was on the wall of his bedroom when he died in November of 1954." Installation was completed in 1956.

=== Death ===
Matisse died of a heart attack at the age of 84 on 3 November 1954. He is buried in the cemetery of the Monastère Notre Dame de Cimiez, in the Cimiez neighbourhood of Nice.

== Legacy ==
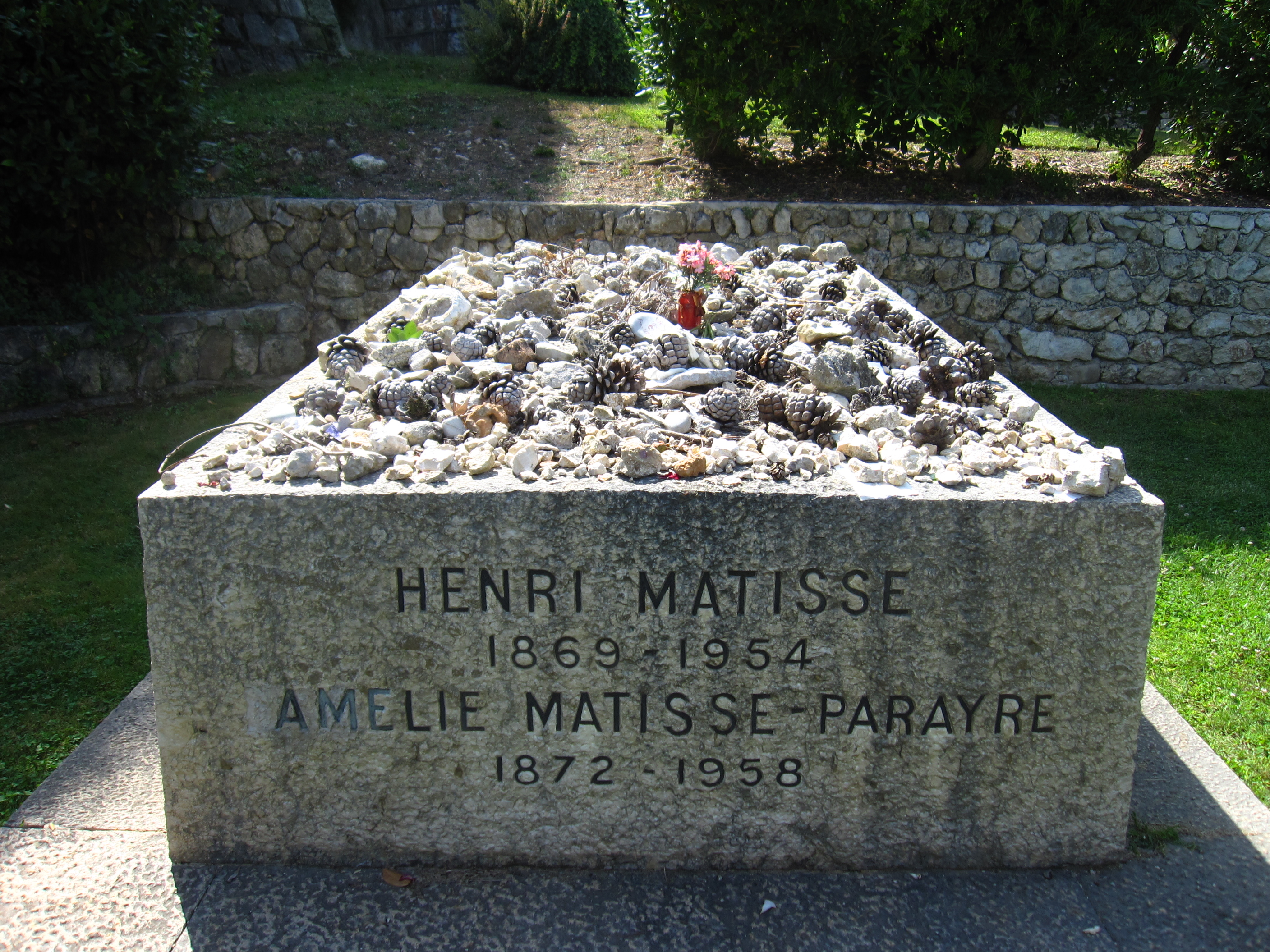
Tombstone of Henri Matisse and his wife Amélie Noellie, cemetery of the Monastère Notre Dame de Cimiez

The first painting of Matisse acquired by a public collection was Still Life with Geraniums (1910), acquired in 1912 by the Pinakothek der Moderne.

Matisse's son Pierre Matisse (1900–1989) opened a modern art gallery in New York City during the 1930s. The Pierre Matisse Gallery, which was active from 1931 until 1989, represented and exhibited many European artists and a few Americans and Canadians in New York often for the first time. He exhibited Joan Miró, Marc Chagall, Alberto Giacometti, Jean Dubuffet, André Derain, Yves Tanguy, Le Corbusier, Paul Delvaux, Wifredo Lam, Jean-Paul Riopelle, Balthus, Leonora Carrington, Zao Wou Ki, Sam Francis, and Simon Hantaï, sculptors Theodore Roszak, Raymond Mason, and Reg Butler, and several other important artists, including the work of Henri Matisse.

The Musée Matisse in Nice, a municipal museum, has one of the world's largest collections of Matisse's works, tracing his artistic beginnings and his evolution through to his last works. The museum, which opened in 1963, is located in the Villa des Arènes, a seventeenth-century villa in the neighbourhood of Cimiez.

His The Plum Blossoms (1948) was purchased on 8 September 2005 for the Museum of Modern Art by Henry Kravis and the new president of the museum, Marie-Josée Drouin. Its estimated price was $25 million. Previously, it had not been seen by the public since 1970.

A crater on the planet Mercury was named Matisse in his honor in 1976.

In film, Matisse was portrayed by Joss Ackland in Surviving Picasso (1996), as well as by Yves-Antoine Spoto in Midnight in Paris (2011).

The Ray Bradbury short story "The Watchful Poker Chip of H. Matisse" contains an allusion to the artist painting an eye on a poker chip for an American man to use as a monocle.

== Nazi-looted art ==
Numerous artworks by Matisse were seized by the Nazis or looted from Jewish collectors or changed hands in forced sales during the Nazi years. In the past twenty years, several artworks by Matisse have been restituted to the heirs of their pre-Third Reich owners, including Le Mur Rose, from France's Pompidou Museum to the heirs of Henry Fuld, "Femme Assise", discovered in the stash of Hildebrand Gurlitt's son in Munich, La vallée de la Stour, which had belonged to Anna Jaffé, found in the La Chaux-de-Fonds Museum and many others. The German Lost Art Foundation lists 38 artworks by Matisse in the Lost Art Internet Database.

== Recent exhibitions ==
From 5 October 2001 to 20 January 2002, the Fundación Juan March, Madrid exhibited Matisse. Spirit and Emotion. Works on Paper. The exhibition “highlights the relationship between the strength of the drawing's creative stroke and the expressive intensity associated with colour, the two essential foundations on which Matisse's work is based.”

In 2004, the Metropolitan Museum of Art, the Royal Academy of Arts, London and Le Musée Matisse, Le Cateau-Cambrésis organized Matisse: The Fabric of Dreams: His Art and His Textiles, displaying Matisse’s textile collection with works showing the textiles. The exhibit was shown at the Musée Matisse (23 October 2004–25 January 2005), the Royal Academy of Arts (5 March–30 May 2005) and the Metropolitan Museum of Art (23 June–25 September 2005). The catalog was written by Hilary Spurling, Kathleen Brunner, Ann Dumas and others. ISBN 978-1-903-97347-9

In 2012, Matisse: In Search of True Painting was organized by The Metropolitan Museum of Art, New York, in collaboration with the Statens Museum for Kunst, Copenhagen, and the Centre Pompidou, Musée National d'Art Moderne, Paris. Roberta Smith of The New York Times described it as "the most thrillingly instructive exhibitions of [Matisse]." The exhibit was shown at the Centre Pompidou, Paris (7 March–18 June 2012), at the Metropolitan Museum of Art (4 December 2012–17 March 2013) and the Statens Museum for Kunst, Copenhagen (14 July–28 October 2012). The catalog was edited by Rebecca Rabinow and Dorthe Aagesen ISBN 978-0300184976

Henri Matisse: The Cut-Outs was exhibited at London's Tate Modern, from April to September 2014. The show was the largest and most extensive of the cut-outs ever mounted, including approximately 100 paper maquettes—borrowed from international public and private collections—as well as a selection of related drawings, prints, illustrated books, stained glass, and textiles. In total, the retrospective featured 130 works encompassing his practice from 1937 to 1954. The Tate Modern show was the first in its history to attract more than half a million people.

The show was then moved to New York's Museum of Modern Art, where it was on display from 12 October 2014, until 10 February 2015. The newly conserved cut-out, The Swimming Pool, which had not been exhibited for more than 20 years, returned to the galleries as the centerpiece of the exhibition.

From 30 October 2015 through 18 January 2016, the Morgan Library & Museum held of an exhibit of his book illustration projects titled, Graphic Passion: Matisse and the Book Arts.

In 2018, Matisse's work was exhibited alongside that of Joan Miró, Le Corbusier, Raymond Hains and Éric Sandillon at the Museum of Decorative Arts and Design in Riga, Latvia. This exhibition, titled "Colour of Gobelins: Contemporary Gobelins from the 'Mobilier national' collection in France," took place during the sixth edition of the Riga Textile Art.

From 1 May to 10 September 2022, the Museum of Modern Art exhibited Matisse's painting The Red Studio, along with "paintings and drawings closely related to The Red Studio".

In 2023, the Metropolitan Museum of Art and the Museum of Fine Arts, Houston, co-organized and exhibited Vertigo of Color: Matisse, Derain, and the Origins of Fauvism, an exhibit examining their work together and the birth of Fauvism. The Metropolitan Museum of Art exhibited the show 13 October 2023 to 21 January 2024; the Museum of Fine Arts, Houston exhibited it 25 February–27 May 2024. The catalog was written by Dita Amory and Ann Dumas.

From 4 April to 24 August 2025, the Musée d’Art Moderne de Paris exhibited Matisse and Marguerite: Through Her Father's Eyes. The exhibit featured more than 110 paintings, drawings, prints and sculpture by Matisse of his daughter Marguerite created over four decades. Following closure of the show, Barbara Dauphin Duthuit, wife of Marguerite's son Claude Duthuit, donated the works she had lent to the show to the Musée d’Art Moderne de Paris. (Claude Duthuit was the son of Marguerite and Georges Duthuit.)

From 7 March–1 June 2026, the Art Institute of Chicago will exhibit Matisse’s Jazz: Rhythms in Color featuring his vibrant compositions combined with his original text that was collected in the unbound book Jazz.

The Baltimore Museum of Art exhibited three exhibitions of Matisse’s work in 2026. Fratino and Matisse: To See This Light Again (11 March 2026–6 September 2026) pairs Matisse’s works with those of Baltimore native painter Louis Fratino. Matisse and Martinique: Portraits and Poetry (18 March 2026–25 October 2026) focuses on lithographs Matisse created for a book of poems by John-Antoine Nau. Matisse in Vence: The Stations of the Cross (29 March 2026–28 June 2026) exhibits drawings for the Stations of the Cross mural created for the Chapel of the Rosary in Vence.

From 24 March–26 July 2026, the Grand Palais, Paris, hosted an exhibition called Matisse 1941 – 1954 featuring "over 300 paintings, drawings, books and cut-out gouaches retrace, between 1941 and 1954." The exhibit will be accompanied by a catalog Color Unbound: Henri Matisse 1941-1954, by Claudine Grammont (ISBN 978-0-500-03157-5).

From 9 April–22 May 2026, Acquavella Galleries exhibited Matisse: The Pursuit of Harmony featuring more than 50 paintings, sculptures and works on paper on loan from public and private collections with examples for five decades of his work.

From 16 May–13 September 2026 San Francisco Museum of Modern Art exhibited Matisse's Femme au chapeau: A Modern Scandal which restages what visitors and critics experienced when they first encountered Femme au chapeau (Woman with a Hat) in 1905 “painted in bold color and loose brushstrokes that defied convention.”

== Honors and awards ==
Commander of the Order of Legion of Honour (1947)

== Partial list of works ==
=== Paintings ===
- Woman Reading (1894), Musée National d'Art Moderne Paris
- Le Mur Rose (1898), Musée National d'Art Moderne
- Canal du Midi (1898), Thyssen-Bornemisza Museum
- Notre-Dame, une fin d'après-midi (1902), Albright-Knox Art Gallery, Buffalo, New York
- Luxe, Calme, et Volupté (1904), Musée National d'Art Moderne
- Green Stripe (1905)
- The Open Window (1905)
- Woman with a Hat (1905)
- Les toits de Collioure (1905)
- Landscape at Collioure (1905)
- Le bonheur de vivre (1906)
- The Young Sailor II (1906)
- Self-Portrait in a Striped T-shirt (1906)
- Madras Rouge (1907)
- Blue Nude (1907), Baltimore Museum of Art
- The Dessert: Harmony in Red (The Red Room) (1908)
- Bathers with a Turtle (1908), Saint Louis Art Museum, Missouri
- La Danse (1909)
- Still Life with Geraniums (1910)
- L'Atelier Rouge (1911)
- The Conversation (1908–1912)
- Zorah on the Terrace (1912)
- Goldfish (1912)
- Le Rifain assis (1912)
- Window at Tangier (1912)
- Le rideau jaune (the yellow curtain) (1915)
- The Window (1916), Detroit Institute of Arts, Michigan
- The Painter and His Model (1916–17)
- The Windshield, On the Road to Villacoublay (1917), Cleveland Museum of Art
- La leçon de musique (1917)
- Interior A Nice (1920)
- Festival of Flowers, Nice (1923), Cleveland Museum of Art
- Odalisque with Raised Arms (1923), National Gallery of Art, Washington, D.C.
- Yellow Odalisque (1926)
- The Dance II (1932), triptych mural (45 ft by 15 ft) in the Barnes Foundation of Philadelphia
- Robe violette et Anémones (1937)
- Woman in a Purple Coat (1937)
- Le Rêve de 1940 (the dream of 1940) (1940)
- La Blouse Roumaine (1940)
- Interior with an Etruscan Vase (1940), Cleveland Museum of Art
- Le Lanceur De Couteaux (1943)
- Annelies, White Tulips and Anemones (1944), Honolulu Museum of Art
- L'Asie (1946)
- Deux fillettes, fond jaune et rouge (1947)
- Jazz (1947)
- The Plum Blossoms (1948)
- Chapelle du Saint-Marie du Rosaire (1948–1951)
- Beasts of the Sea (1950)
- The Sorrows of the King (1952)
- Black Leaf on Green Background (1952)
- La Négresse (1952)
- Blue Nude II (1952)
- The Snail (1953)
- Le Bateau (1954) This gouache created a minor stir when the MoMA mistakenly displayed it upside-down for 47 days in 1961.

=== Illustrations ===
- Jean Cocteau, Bertrand Guégan (1892–1943); L'almanach de Cocagne pour l'an 1920–1922, Dédié aux vrais Gourmands Et aux Francs Buveurs

=== Writings ===
- Notes of a Painter ("Note d'un peintre") (1908)
- Painter's Notes on Drawing ("Notes d'un peintre sur son dessin") (1939)
- Jazz (1947)
- Matisse on Art, collected by Jack D. Flam (1973)
- Chatting with Henri Matisse: The Lost 1941 Interview (2013)
