= 1905 in art =

Events from the year 1905 in art.

== Events ==
- April – French art dealer Paul Durand-Ruel opens the first major exhibition in Britain of Impressionist paintings, at the Grafton Galleries in London. With 315 works, it is the largest exhibition of Impressionism ever staged, including many works by Degas, but, although critically acclaimed, there are no sales.
- Summer – Henri Matisse and André Derain work together in the French Mediterranean village of Collioure.
- October – Salon d'Automne in Paris: the vivid colors used by Matisse and others lead the critic Louis Vauxcelles to describe their works derisively as les Fauves ("the wild beasts"), marking the start of Fauvism.
- Die Brücke group of German expressionist artists formed in Dresden.
- Léon Bonnat succeeds Paul Dubois as director of the Ecole des Beaux Arts.
- Alfred Stieglitz and Edward Steichen open the Little Galleries of the Photo-Secession (later known as 291) photo art gallery on Fifth Avenue in New York City.
- Opening of the Gibbes Museum of Art in Charleston, South Carolina.
- Jacob Epstein establishes his studio in London.

== Works ==
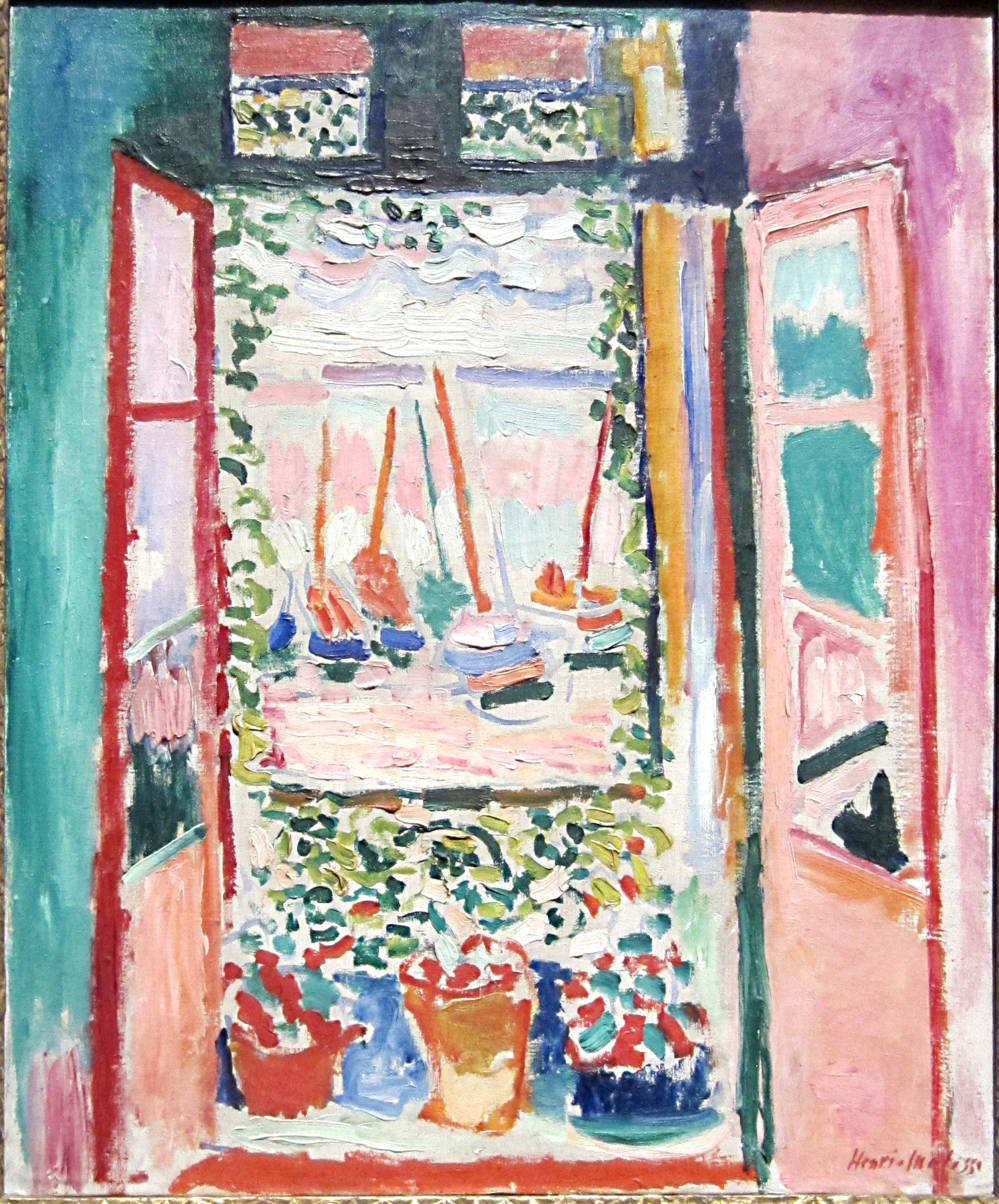
Matisse – The Open Window

- Anna Ancher – Harvesters
- Umberto Boccioni – Self-portrait
- Gustaf Cederström – Victory at Narva
- Evelyn De Morgan – Queen Eleanor and Fair Rosamund
- Jacob Epstein – Mrs Epstein Leaning on One Hand (portrait bust)
- Florence Fuller – A Golden Hour
- J. W. Godward
  - Flabellifera
  - A Greek Beauty
  - Mischief
  - A Roman Matron
- Gustav Klimt - Birch Forrest
- Maximilien Luce – A Street in Paris in May 1871
- Konstantin Makovsky – Christmastide Divination (approximate year)
- Henri Matisse
  - Landscape at Collioure
  - The Open Window, Collioure
  - Still Life with Geraniums
  - Les toits de Collioure
  - Portrait of Madame Matisse (The green line)
  - Woman with a Hat
- Jean Metzinger – Two Nudes in an Exotic Landscape
- Charles Mulligan – Statue of William McKinley (Chicago)
- Elisabet Ney
  - Sam Houston (sculpture)
  - Statue of Stephen F. Austin
  - Lady Macbeth (sculpture)
- Richard Norris-
  - Pocahontas
- Pablo Picasso
  - Family of Saltimbanques
  - Garçon à la pipe
  - Les Noces de Pierrette
  - Portrait of Madame Canals (Musée Picasso, Paris)
  - Lady with a Fan (National Gallery of Art, Washington, D.C.)
- Henri Rousseau – The Hungry Lion Throws Itself on the Antelope
- Marianne Stokes – Hungarian portrait
- Abanindranath Tagore
  - Bharat Mata
  - Dancing Girl
- John Singer Sargent - Lady Warwick and her Son
- Frank Teich – Statue of Richard W. Dowling (sculpture, Houston)

== Births ==
- January 29 – Barnett Newman, American artist (d. 1970)
- February 1 – Doris Lee, American painter (d. 1983)
- February 4 – Jared French, American painter (d. 1988)
- March 9 – Félix Labisse, French painter and designer (d. 1982)
- May 5 – Floyd Gottfredson, American cartoonist (d. 1986)
- April 6 – Andrée Ruellan, American painter (d. 2006)
- May 10 – Alex Schomburg, Puerto Rican-American painter and illustrator (d. 1998)
- May 12 – Leonard Bahr, American portrait and mural painter (d. 1990)
- May 15 – Albert Dubout, French cartoonist, illustrator, painter and sculptor (d. 1976)
- June 5 – Wayne Boring, American illustrator (d. 1987)
- June 24 – Rex Whistler, English painter (k. 1944)
- June 28 – Rowland Hilder, American-born English landscape painter (d. 1993)
- July 4? – Claude Buckle, English poster artist and watercolourist (d. 1973)
- July 6 – Juan O'Gorman, Mexican painter and architect (d. 1982)
- July 8 – Leonid Amalrik, Russian animator and animation director (d. 1997)
- August 12 – Stevan Bodnarov, Serbian sculptor and painter (d. 1993)
- September 5 – Todd Webb, American photographer (d. 2000)
- October 14 – Ruth Bernhard, American photographer (d. 2006)
- November 1 – Paul-Émile Borduas, French Canadian abstract painter (d. 1960)
- November 3 – Lois Mailou Jones, African American painter (d. 1998)
- December 22 – James A. Porter, African American painter and art historian (d. 1970)
- date unknown
  - Elwin Hawthorne, English painter (d. 1954)
  - Walter Pritchard, Scottish stained glass artist, mural painter and sculptor (d. 1977)

== Deaths ==
- January 5 – Rudolf Koller, Swiss painter (b. 1828)
- January 13 – Robert Swain Gifford, American landscape painter (b. 1840)
- January 19 – George Henry Boughton, American painter (b. 1834)
- January 21 – Robert Brough, Swiss painter (b. 1872)
- January 23 – Rafael Bordalo Pinheiro, Portuguese painter, sculptor and caricaturist (b. 1846)
- February 1 – Oswald Achenbach, German landscape painter (b. 1827)
- February 9 – Adolph von Menzel, German painter and engraver (b. 1815)
- March 1 – Jean-Baptiste Claude Eugène Guillaume, French sculptor (b. 1822)
- March 3 – William Brassington, New Zealand sculptor and ornamental mason (b. c.1837)
- April 4 – Constantin Meunier, Belgian painter and sculptor (b. 1831)
- May 23 – Paul Dubois, French painter and sculptor (b. 1829)
- July 23 – Jean-Jacques Henner, French painter (b. 1829)
- August 5 (or 6) – Anton Ažbe, Slovene realist painter and art teacher (b. 1862)
- August 18 – Albert Edelfelt, Finnish painter (b. 1854)
- August 19 – William-Adolphe Bouguereau, French academic painter (b. 1825)
- September 14 – Odoardo Borrani, Italian painter associated with the Macchiaioli (b. 1833)
- October 2 – Alexander Seik, Czech painter and photographer (b. 1824)
- November 8 – Victor Borisov-Musatov, Russian post-Impressionist painter (b. 1870) (heart attack)
- November 17 – Gustave Crauck, French sculptor (b. 1827)
- December 4 – Henry Hugh Armstead, English sculptor and illustrator (b. 1828)
- December 16 – Alfred Walter Williams, English landscape painter (b. 1824)
- date unknown – Emma Brownlow, English-born genre painter (b. c.1832)
