= Open Window =

Open Window may refer to:

- Open Window (album), a 2004 album by Robert Rich
- Open Window (film), a 2006 American film written and directed by Mia Goldman
- The Open Window (Matisse), a 1905 painting by Henri Matisse
- The Open Window (Bonnard), a 1921 painting Pierre Bonnard
- "The Open Window", a story by Saki
- The Open Window, a 1954 stage drama written by Lenore Coffee and William Joyce Cowen
- The Open Window, a 1956 opera by Malcolm Arnold
- The Open Window, composers of the music for Oh! Calcutta!
