= Spring on West 78th Street =

1905 painting by Childe Hassam

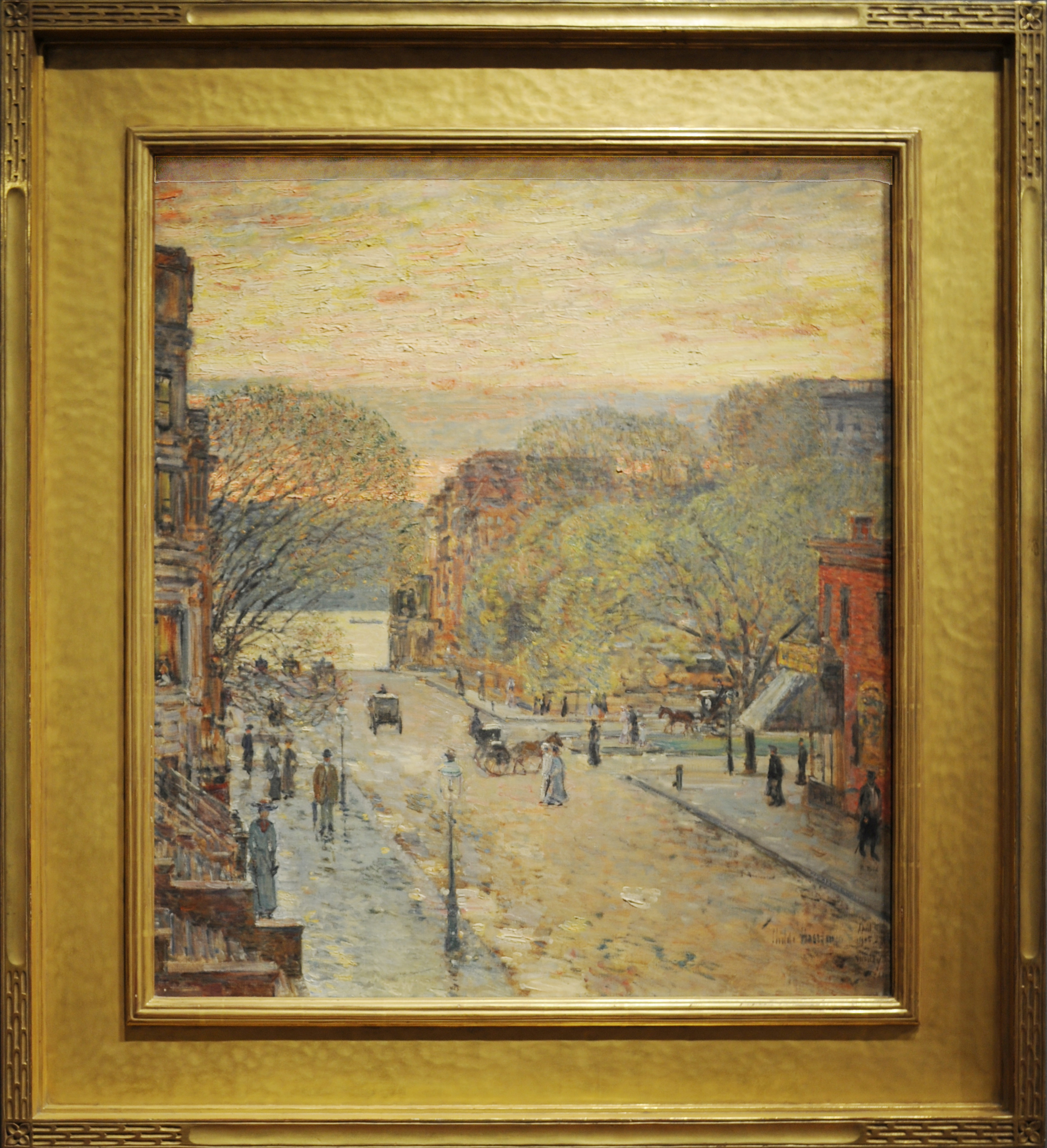
- Artist: Childe Hassam
- Year: 1905
- Location: Seattle Art Museum, Seattle, Washington, U.S.

Spring on West 78th Street is a 1905 oil painting by the American Impressionist painter Childe Hassam. The artwork is part of the collection of the Seattle Art Museum.
