= View of Notre-Dame =

Painting by Henri Matisse

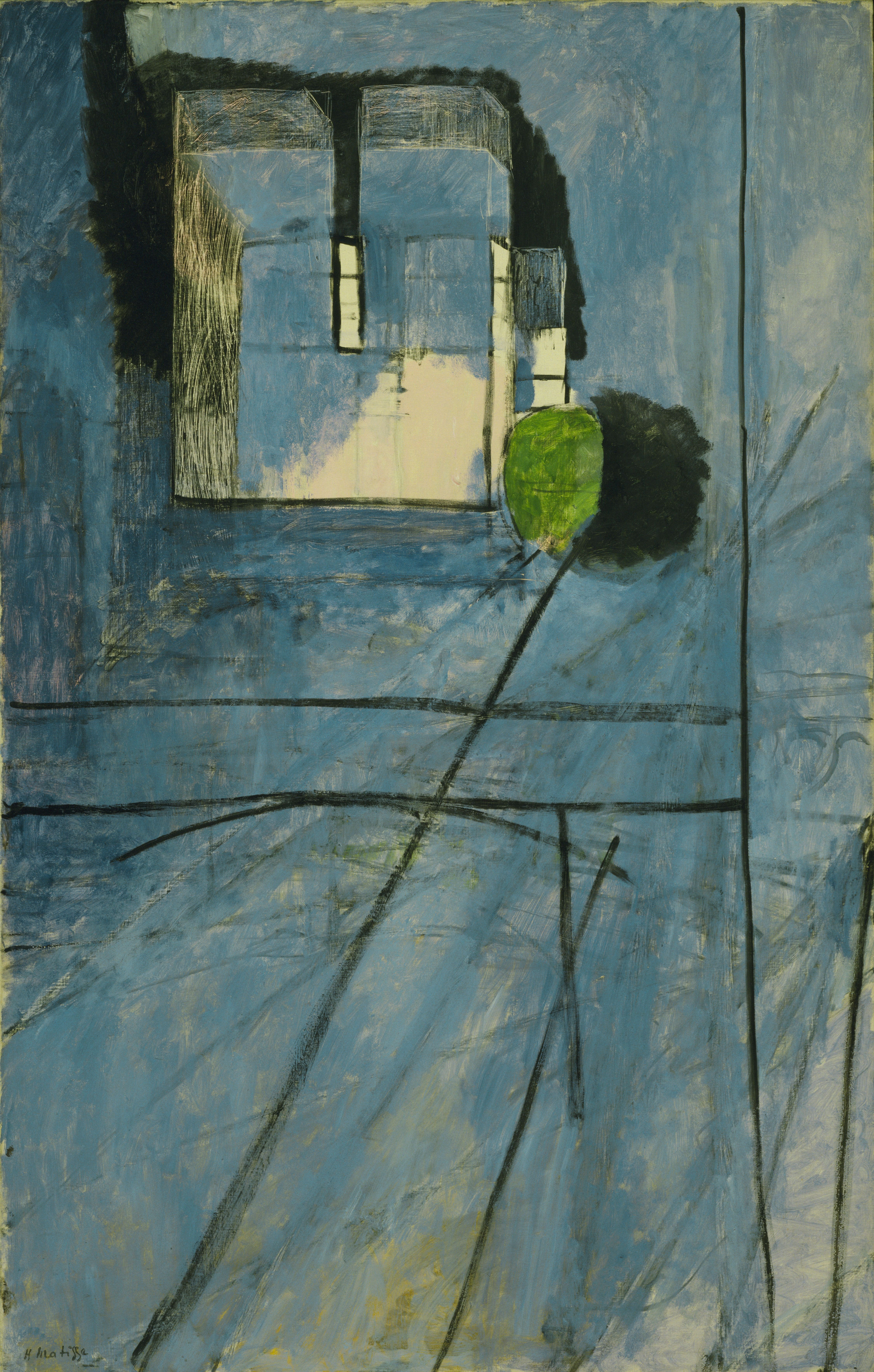
View of Notre-Dame (1914). Oil on canvas, 58 x 37 1/8" (147.3 x 94.3 cm). In the collection of the Museum of Modern Art. Acquired through the Lillie P. Bliss Bequest

View of Notre-Dame (French: Une vue de Notre-Dame) is an oil painting by Henri Matisse from 1914. It is held in the Museum of Modern Art, in New York.

== Experimental period ==
Along with works such as Woman on a High Stool, it belongs to the "experimental period" of Matisse's oeuvre. Pentimenti reveal that it was originally painted in a more detailed manner before it was radically simplified into a geometric composition.

== Exhibition ==
It was not exhibited until after Matisse's death, but proved a great influence upon later developments in painting. Specifically, it is said to have considerably influenced American artists who developed new modern and abstract styles, i.e. Color field and Abstract Expressionism, such as Richard Diebenkorn.

== See also ==
- List of works by Henri Matisse

== Notes ==
- Elderfield, John (1996). Henri Matisse: Masterworks from the Museum of Modern Art. New York City: MOMA. ISBN 0-87070-112-6.
