= Two Odalisques, One Being Nude, Ornamental Ground and Checkerboard =

Painting by Henri Matisse

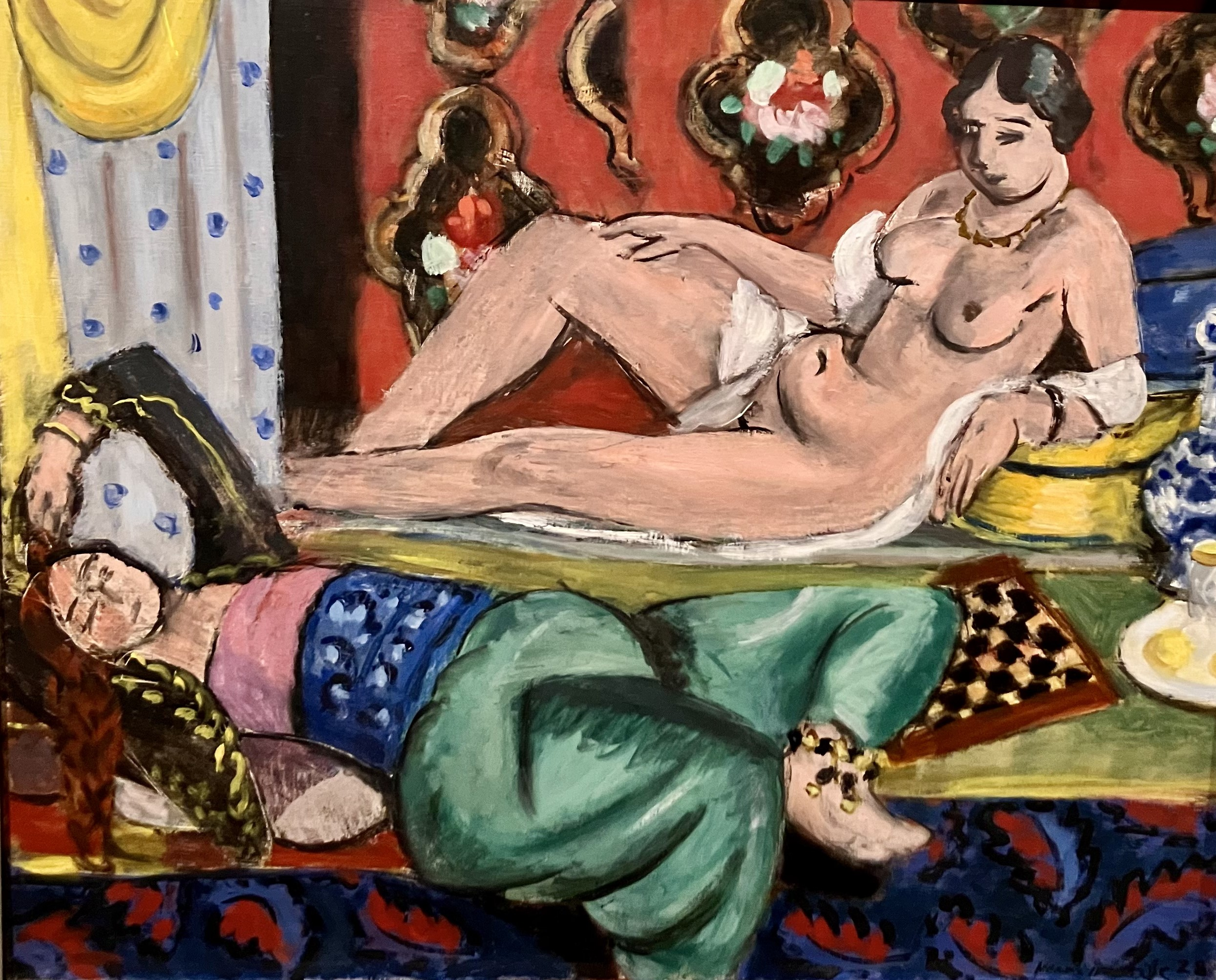
- Artist: Henri Matisse
- Year: 1928
- Medium: Oil on canvas
- Movement: Fauvism
- Dimensions: 54 cm × 65 cm (21 in × 26 in)
- Location: Moderna museet; Stockholm

Two Odalisques, One Being Nude, Ornamental Ground and Checkerboard (French: Deux odalisques dont l'une dévetue, fond ornemental et damier) is an oil on canvas painting from 1928 by the French artist Henri Matisse. It was painted in 1928 and has been in the collection of the Moderna museet in Stockholm since 1929. The painting is signed "Henri Matisse 28".

== Description ==
The painting depicts two reclining models in a room with colourful decoration on the walls and floor. Between them is a checkerboard. Matisse executed the work during his "Nice period" when he was influenced by Islamic art and his travels to North Africa. During this period he painted a large number of works depicting odalisques, that is a more or less naked women in an oriental setting that he had arranged in his studio in Nice.

== Similar paintings by Matisse ==
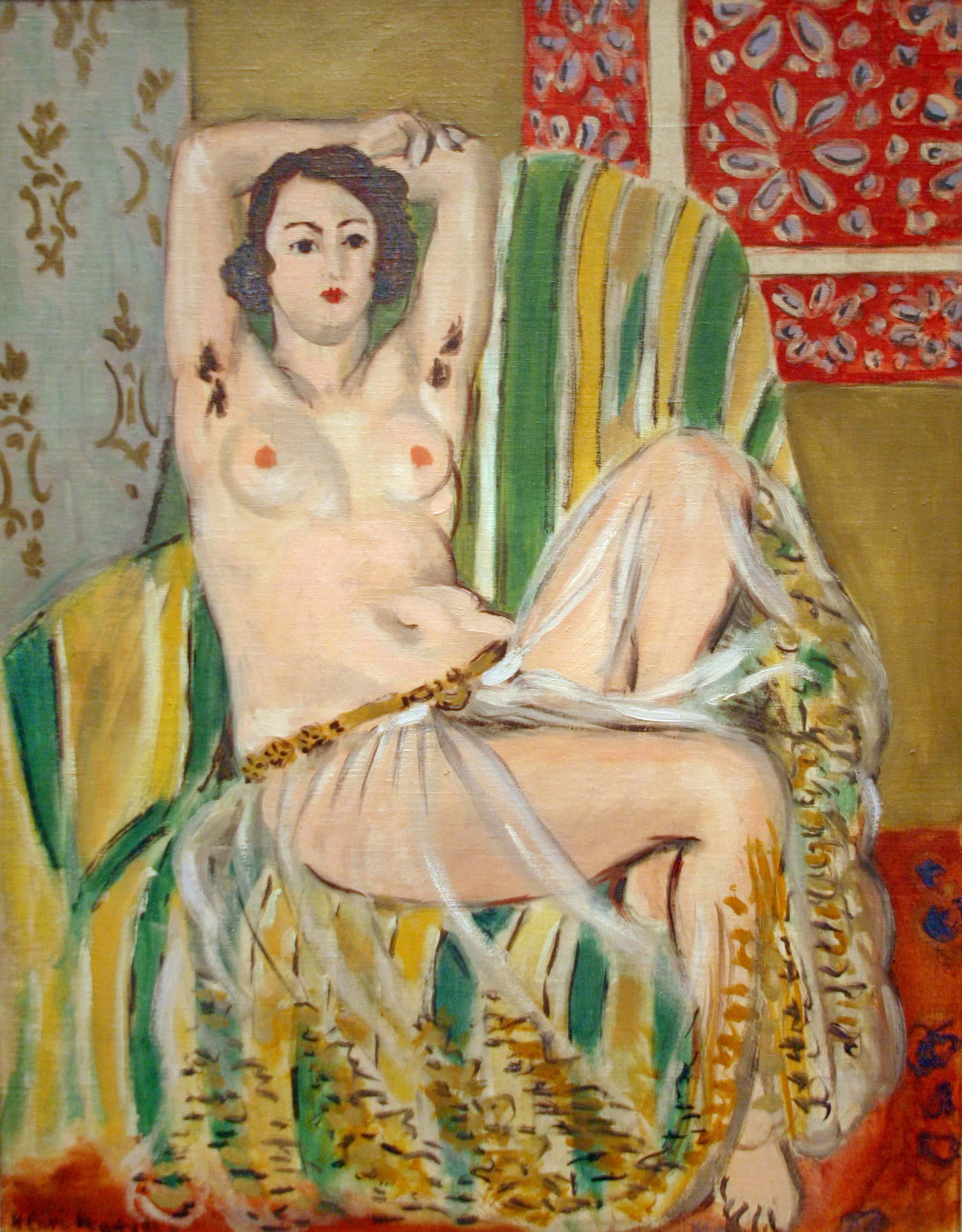
Odalisque with Raised Arms (1925–1926), National Gallery of Art.

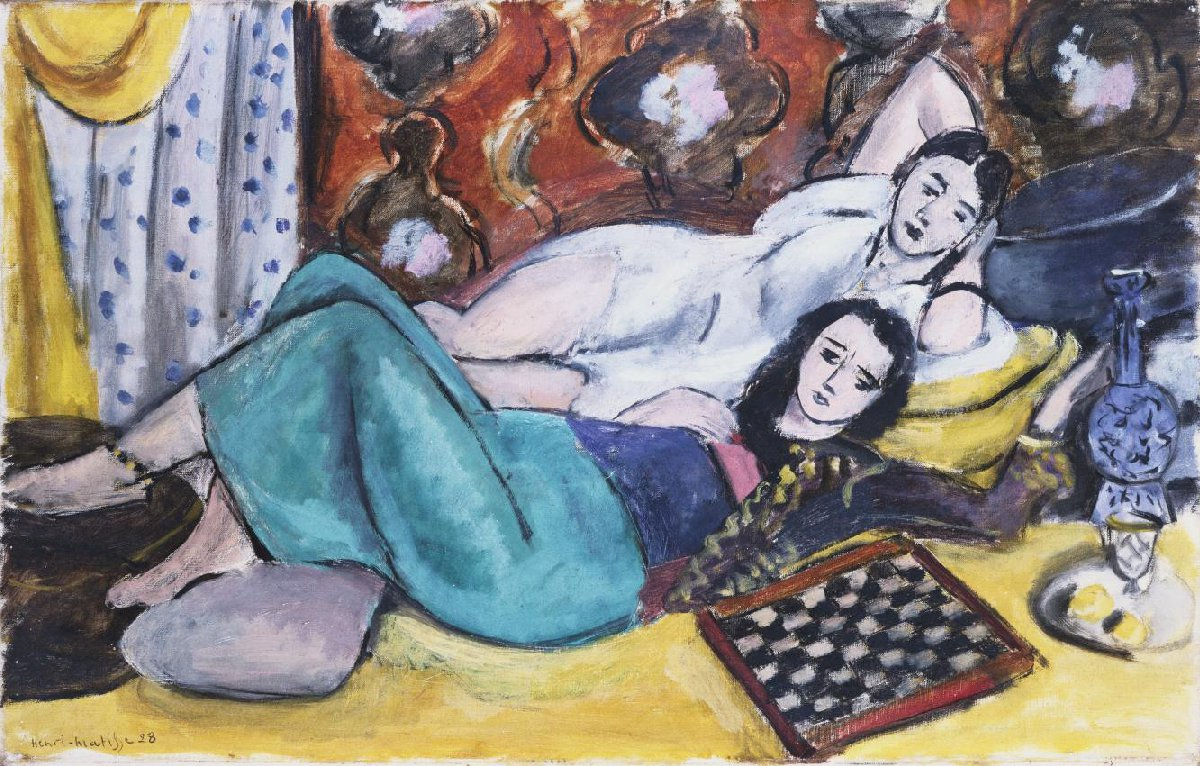
Two Models Resting (1928), Philadelphia Museum of Art.

== See also ==
- List of works by Henri Matisse
