= The Sorrows of the King =

Painting by Henri Matisse

- Artist: Henri Matisse
- Year: 1952
- Type: Gouache on paper on canvas
- Dimensions: 292 cm × 386 cm (115 in × 152 in)
- Location: Musée National d'Art Moderne; Paris

The Sorrows of the King is a collage using cut out paper shapes by Henri Matisse from 1952. It was made from paper he had coloured with gouache paint and is mounted on canvas. Its area is 292 x 386 cm. It was his final self-portrait. During the early-to-mid-1940s Matisse was in poor health. By 1950 he stopped painting in favor of his paper cutouts. The Sorrows of the King is an example of Matisse's final body of works known as the cutouts.

The British composer Peter Seabourne b.1960 wrote a septet The Sadness of the King (2007) inspired by this late paper cut, performed in Chicago and by members of the Lahti Symphony Orchestra in Lahti, Finland.

== See also ==
- List of works by Henri Matisse
