= Woman Reading =

Painting by Henri Matisse

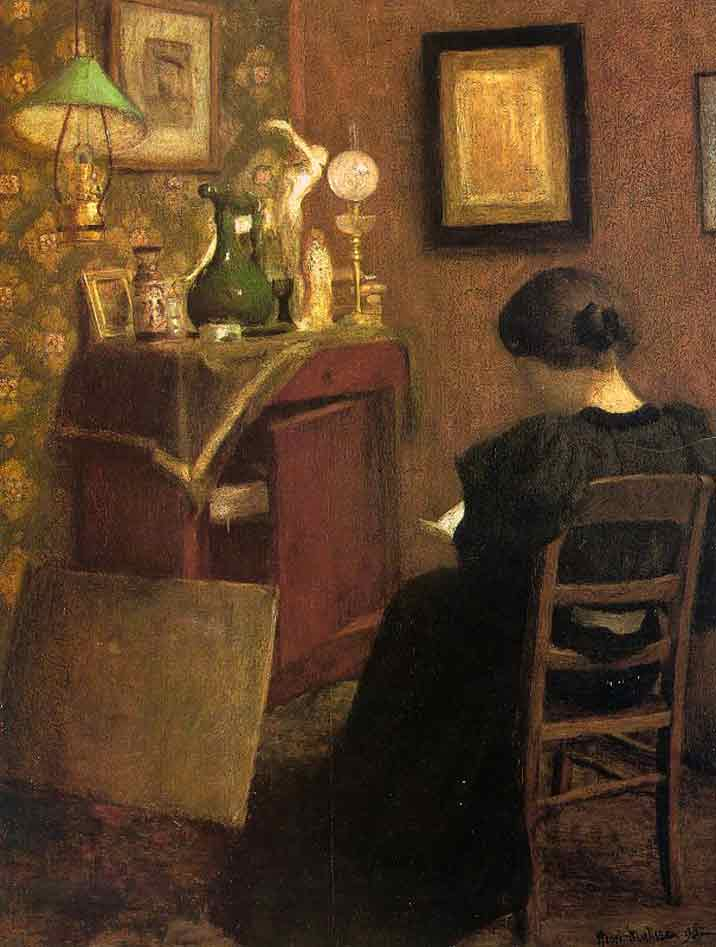
- Artist: Henri Matisse
- Year: 1895
- Medium: Oil on canvas
- Dimensions: 61.5 cm × 48 cm (24.2 in × 19 in)
- Location: Musée Matisse, Le Cateau-Cambrésis

Woman Reading (La Liseuse) is an oil-on-board painting executed in 1895 by the French artist Henri Matisse. It is displayed at the Musée Matisse, in Le Cateau-Cambrésis, having been on loan from the Centre Pompidou since 2002. It shows a woman, dressed in black, seated and reading, with her back to the viewer, in the calmness of a somewhat cluttered room. Matisse incorporated a self-portrait into the painting in the form of a framed drawing hanging on the wall at the upper left.

The painting was originally exhibited at the Salon of 1896 held in Paris by the Société Nationale des Beaux-Arts and marked his first signicant success.

== See also ==
- List of works by Henri Matisse
