= Notre-Dame, une fin d'après-midi =

Painting by Henri Matisse

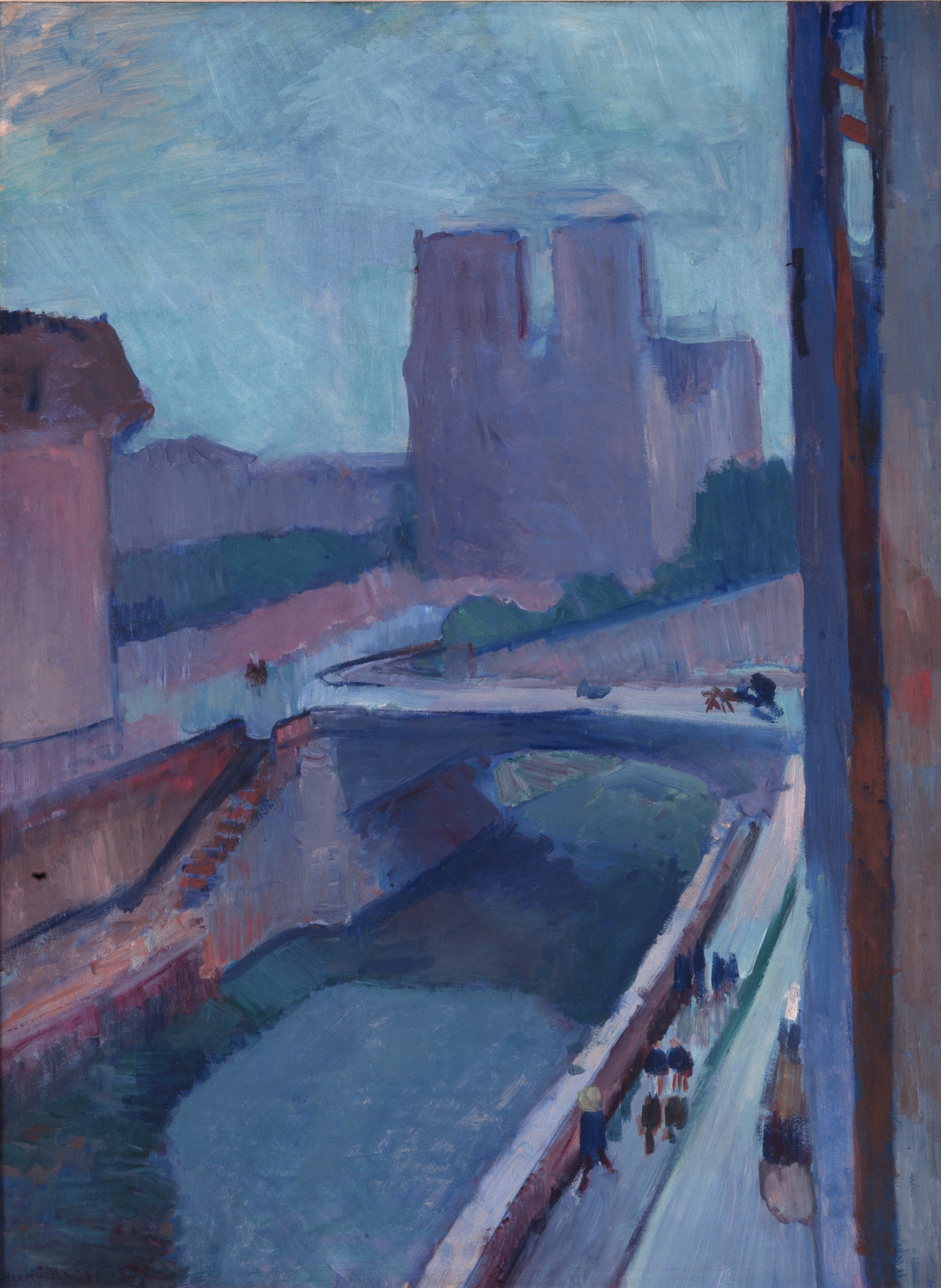
- Artist: Henri Matisse
- Year: 1902
- Type: Oil on paper mounted on canvas
- Dimensions: 72.5 cm × 54.5 cm (28 1/2 in × 21 1/2 in)
- Location: Albright–Knox Art Gallery; Buffalo

Notre-Dame, une fin d'après-midi ("A Glimpse of Notre-Dame in the Late Afternoon") is a painting by Henri Matisse from 1902. Its somber coloration is typical of Matisse's works executed between the end of 1901 and the end of 1903, a period of personal difficulties for the artist. This episode has been called Matisse's Dark Period.

The work is an oil painting on paper mounted on canvas and it measures 72.5 by 54.5 centimetres (28 1/2 by 21 1/2 inches). It is in the Albright–Knox Art Gallery, Buffalo, New York.

== Background ==
Between 1896 and 1901, Matisse's painting had progressed from the subdued tones of his earliest works to an intense colorism that prefigured the Fauvism to come. In 1896 and 1897 he had traveled to Brittany, where the Australian painter John Russell encouraged him to paint en plein air. Through Russell he met Camille Pissarro, whose influence was decisive in making a colorist of Matisse. In 1898 he traveled to London, where he studied the works of J. M. W. Turner; then, after a year spent in Corsica and Toulouse, he returned to Paris, where the startling boldness of his work was admired by other young artists. His paintings found few buyers, however, and his wife, Amélie, had to open a dress shop to support their household.

In May 1902 a major financial scandal, the Humbert Affair, unexpectedly ensnared Amélie's family. Her mother (who was the Humbert family's housekeeper) and father became scapegoats in the scandal; as a result, Matisse was forced to spend much of his time during the next year dealing with lawyers and journalists. His studio was searched by detectives, and his wife's family was menaced by angry mobs of fraud victims. According to art historian Hilary Spurling, "their public exposure, followed by the arrest of his father-in-law, left Matisse as the sole breadwinner for an extended family of seven. This is why he switched to painting canvases that were at least potentially saleable".

Inspired by Rodin and Barye, Matisse struggled to master volume in sculpture as well as in painting. He darkened his palette, with the results seen in the present work, and in such paintings as Carmelina (1903, in the Museum of Fine Arts, Boston).

== See also ==
- List of works by Henri Matisse
