= Asia (Matisse) =

1946 painting by Henri Matisse

- Artist: Henri Matisse
- Year: 1946
- Medium: Oil on canvas
- Dimensions: 116 cm × 81 cm (45.7 in × 31.9 in)
- Location: Kimbell Art Museum; Fort Worth, Texas

Asia (French: L'Asie) is a painting by Henri Matisse. It is an oil on canvas painting from 1946.

The painting is in the collection of and on public display at the Kimbell Art Museum in Fort Worth, Texas (USA).

== Provenance ==
(Pierre Matisse Gallery, New York); Mr. and Mrs. Tom May, Beverly Hills, by 1951; (Frank Perls Gallery, Beverly Hills); purchased 15 November 1954 by Mollie Parnis Livingston [1905-1992], New York; (sale, Sotheby's, New York, 10 November 1992, no. 30); purchased through (Acquavella Galleries, Inc., New York) by Kimbell Art Foundation, Fort Worth, 1993.

== See also ==
- List of works by Henri Matisse
