= The Young Sailor II =

Painting by Henri Matisse

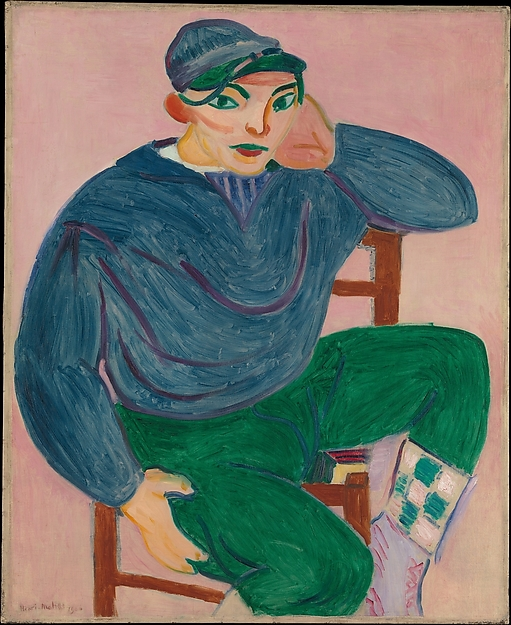
- Artist: Henri Matisse
- Year: 1906
- Medium: Oil on canvas
- Dimensions: 101.6 cm × 81.9 cm (40 in × 32 1/4 in)
- Location: Metropolitan Museum of Art; New York City
- Accession: 1999.363.41

The Young Sailor II is a painting by Henri Matisse from 1906. It is in the collection of the Metropolitan Museum of Art, in New York.

It was donated to the Metropolitan Museum of Art as part of the Jacques and Natasha Gelman Collection, in 1998.

== See also ==
- List of works by Henri Matisse
