= Young Woman Lying on a White Fur =

1944 painting by Henri Matisse

- Jeune femme à la pelisse blanche (French)
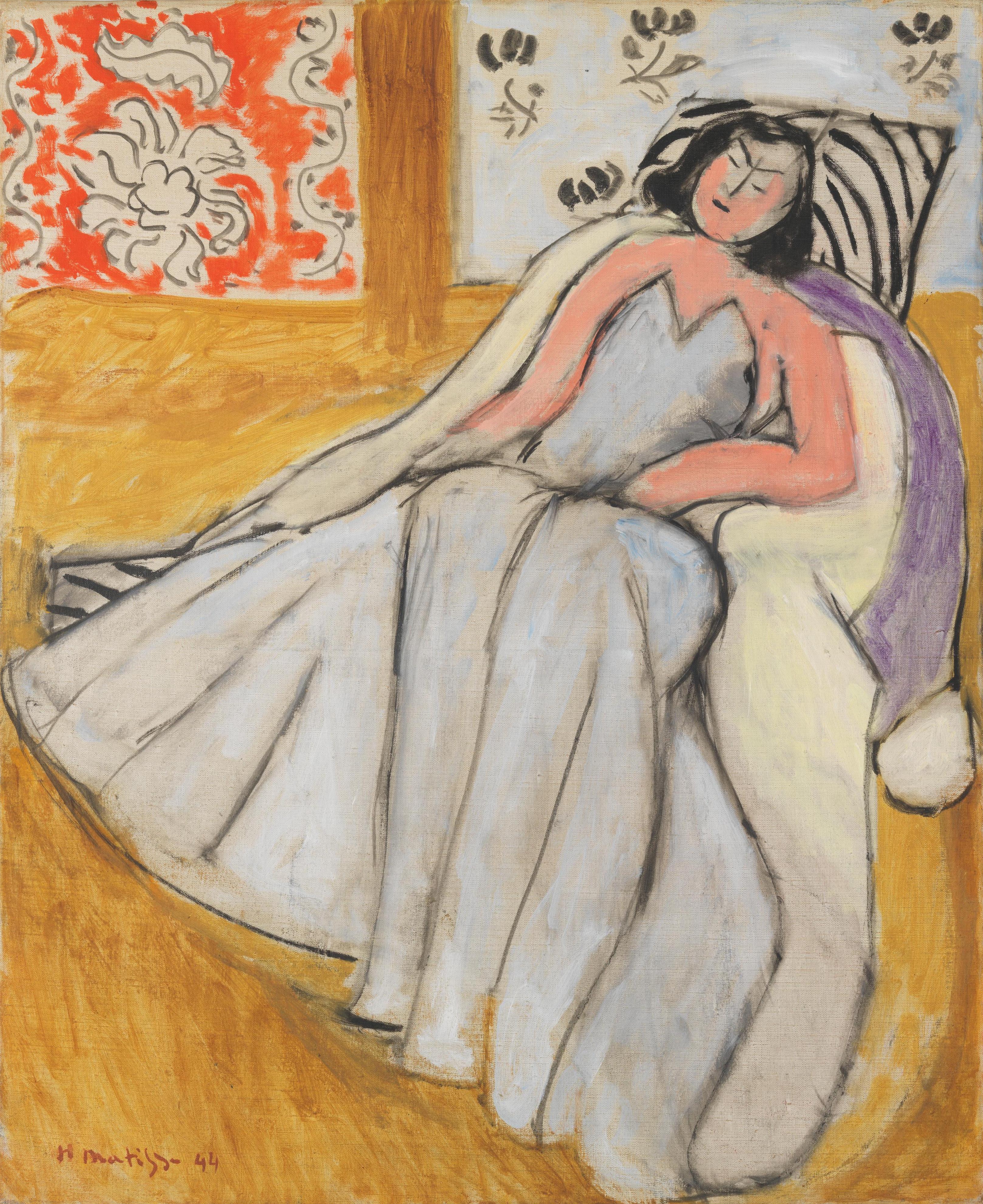
- Artist: Henri Matisse
- Year: 1944
- Medium: Oil on canvas
- Location: Museum of Grenoble

Young Woman Lying on a White Fur (French: Jeune femme à la pelisse blanche) is a 1944 oil on canvas painting by Henri Matisse.

It was given in lieu of tax to the Musée National d'Art Moderne in Paris in 2001 and placed at the Museum of Grenoble, which already had an important collection of Matisse's 1920s works collected by its curator Andry-Farcy.

== See also ==
- List of works by Henri Matisse
