= Beasts of the Sea =

1950 collage by Henri Matisse

- Artist: Henri Matisse
- Year: 1950
- Type: Paper collage on canvas
- Dimensions: 295.5 cm × 154 cm (116 3/8 in × 60 5/8 in)
- Location: National Gallery of Art, Washington, D.C.

Beasts of the Sea (French: Les bêtes de la mer) is a paper collage on canvas by Henri Matisse from 1950. It is currently in the collection of the National Gallery of Art, Washington, D.C. During the early-to-mid-1940s Matisse was in poor health. Eventually by 1950 he stopped painting in favor of his paper cutouts. Beasts of the Sea, is an example of Matisse's final body of works known as the cutouts.

== See also ==
- List of works by Henri Matisse
