= The Painter and His Model =

Painting by Henri Matisse

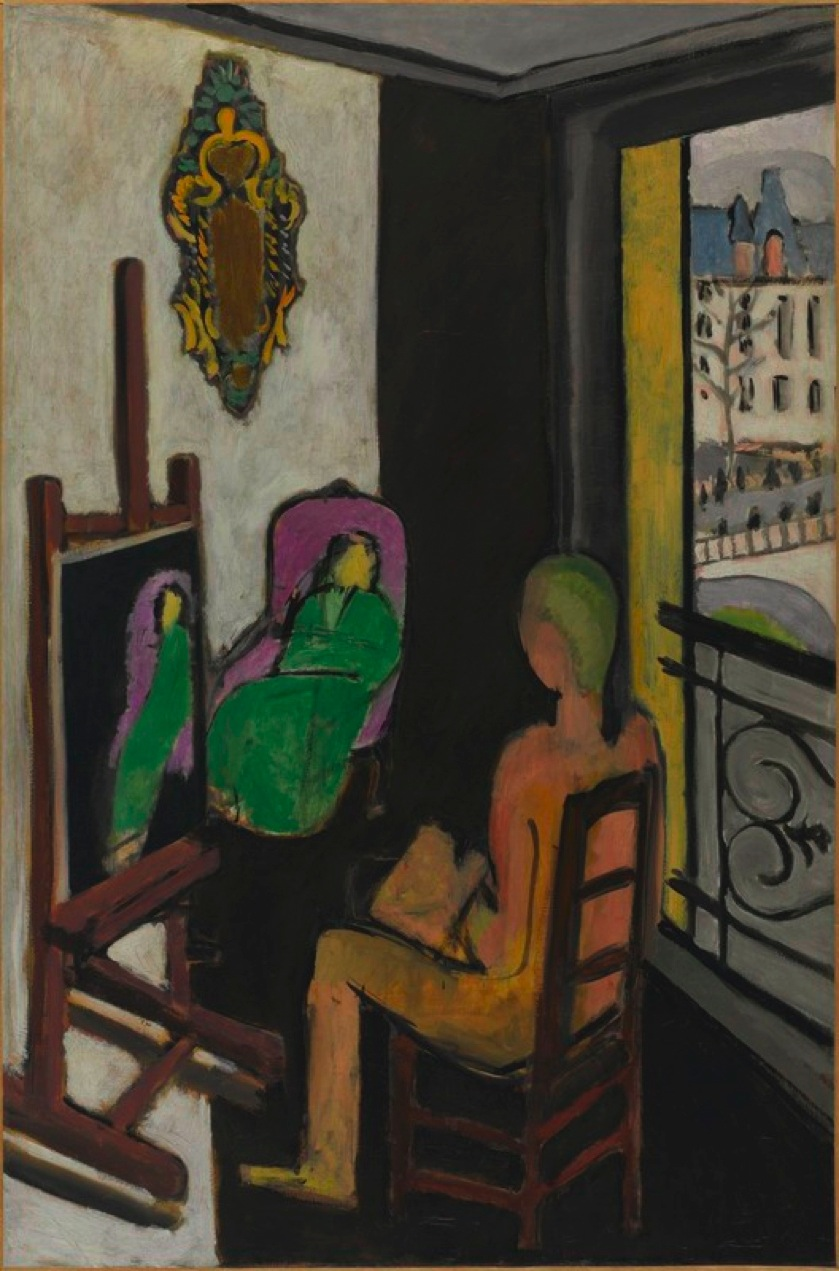
The Painter and His Model, 1916–17, oil on canvas, 146.5 x 97 cm, Museum of Modern Art, Paris

The Painter and His Model (French titles: Le Peintre dans son atelier, Le peintre et son modèle, l'Atelier, quai Saint-Michel) is a work by Henri Matisse painted late 1916, early 1917. It is currently in the collection of the Musée National d'Art Moderne, Centre Georges Pompidou, Paris. In this work Matisse depicted himself in his studio on the fourth floor of 19 Quai Saint-Michel, at work on his painting Laurette in a Green Robe (1916).

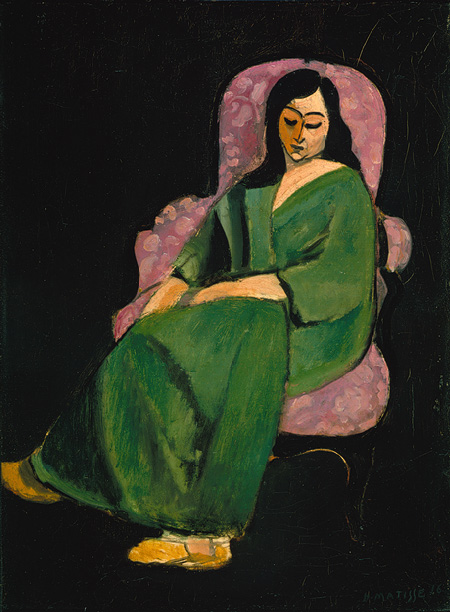
Laurette in a green robe, the painting Matisse portrayed himself working on in The Painter and His Model

This painting belongs to the series of Matisse's studio with views of l'Île de la Cité and the Pont Saint-Michel. According to Matisse (when the painting was acquired by the Musée National d'Art Moderne in 1945), this work was painted in 1917. But the picture in progress on the easel, Laurette sur fond noir, robe verte (Laurette in a Green Robe), Metropolitan Museum of Art, is signed and dated 1916.

The Painter and His Model represents the same model, Laurette, sitting on a pink armchair, silhouetted against the dark background of the studio wall; suggesting the two works were painted around the same time, at the end of 1916. The third part of the triptych dedicated to the Paris workshop and its view of the Pont Saint-Michel, L'atelier du Quai Saint-Michel [The Phillips Collection], is also attributed to 1916. Art historian Jack Flam further emphasizes the color ratios (the use of black) and composition between the canvas and the MNAM painting and two of the most important works of 1916, Les Demoiselles à la rivière and Les Marocains. These arguments lead to the conclusion that The Painter and His Model was painted by Matisse toward the end of 1916, and possibly finished early 1917.

== See also ==
- List of works by Henri Matisse
