= The Snail =

Collage by Henri Matisse

- Artist: Henri Matisse
- Year: 1953
- Type: Gouache on paper
- Dimensions: 287 cm × 288 cm (112 3/4° in × 108 in)
- Location: Tate Modern, London

The Snail (L'escargot) is a collage by Henri Matisse. The work was created from summer 1952 to early 1953. It is pigmented with gouache on paper, cut with shears and pasted onto a base layer of white paper measuring 9'4 3/4" × 9' 5" (287 × 288 cm). The piece is in the Tate Modern collection in London.

== Description and background ==
It consists of a number of colored shapes arranged in a spiral pattern, as suggested by the title. Matisse first drew the snail, then used the colored paper to interpret it. The composition pairs complementary colors: Matisse gave the work the alternative title La Composition Chromatique. From the early-to-mid-1940s Matisse was in increasingly poor health, and was suffering from arthritis. Eventually by 1950 he stopped painting in favor of gouaches découpées, paper cutouts. The Snail is a major example of this final body of works.

== See also ==
- List of works by Henri Matisse
