= Seated Riffian =

1912 painting by Henri Matisse

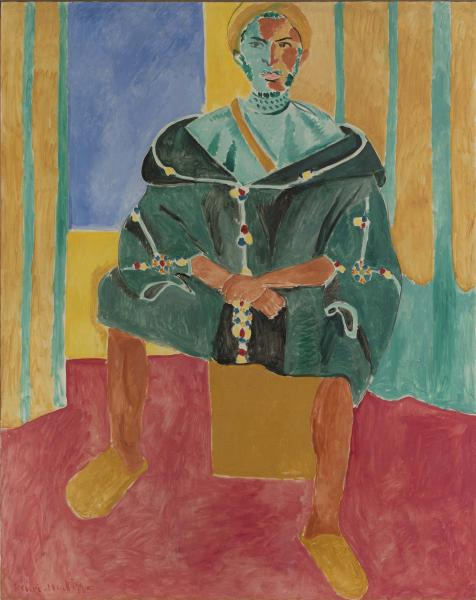
Seated Riffian a 1912 oil on canvas on display at the Barnes Foundation in Philadelphia

Seated Riffian (French: Le Rifain assis) is an oil on canvas painting by Henri Matisse, from December 1912. This work represents an inhabitant of the Rif, in Morocco, dressed in green in a seated position. It is held in the collection of the Barnes Foundation, in Philadelphia, Pennsylvania.

== See also ==
- List of works by Henri Matisse
