= List of works by Henri Matisse =

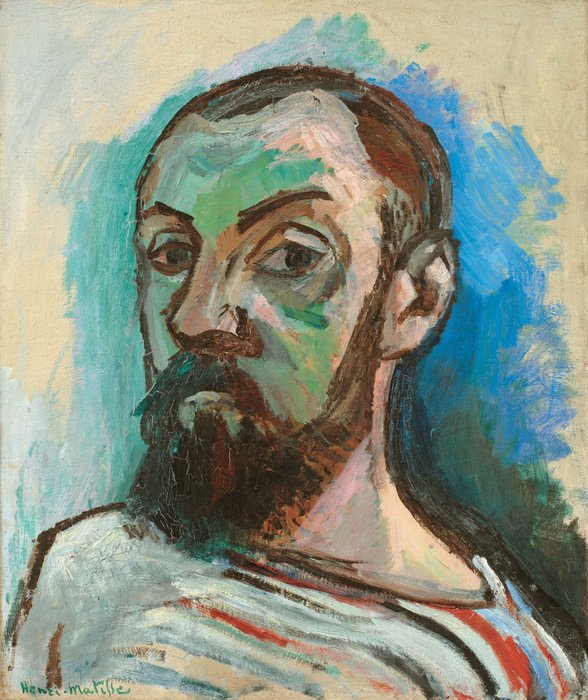
Self-Portrait in a Striped T-shirt 1906, Statens Museum for Kunst, Copenhagen, Denmark.

This is an incomplete list of works by the French modern artist Henri Matisse (31 December 1869 – 3 November 1954). He is admired for his use of color and his fluid, brilliant and original draughtsmanship. He was a Master draughtsman, printmaker, and sculptor, but is known primarily as a painter. Although he was initially labeled as a Fauve (wild beast), by the 1920s, he was increasingly hailed as an upholder of the classical tradition in French painting.

His mastery of the expressive language of color and drawing, displayed in a body of work spanning over a half-century, won him recognition as a leading figure in modern art.

== Paintings ==
| Painting | Name | French name | Year | Technique | Dimensions | City | Gallery | Notes |
|---|---|---|---|---|---|---|---|---|
| | The Study of Gustave Moreau | | 1894–95 | Oil on canvas | 65 × 81 cm | | Private collection | |
| | Woman Reading | La Liseuse | 1895 | Oil on board | 61.5 x 48 cm | Le Cateau-Cambrésis | Musée Matisse | |
| | The Maid | | 1896 | Oil on canvas | 90 × 74 cm | | Private collection | |
| | The Dinner Table | | 1897 | Oil on canvas | 100 x 131 cm | | Private collection | |
| | Blue Pot and Lemon | | c. 1897 | Oil on canvas | 39 × 46.5 cm | St. Petersburg | Hermitage Museum | |
| | Vase of Sunflowers | | 1898 | Oil on canvas | 46 × 38 cm | St. Petersburg | Hermitage Museum | |
| | Landscape, the Pink Wall | Le Mur Rose | 1898 | Oil on canvas | | | Private collection | |
| | Fruit and Coffee-Pot | | 1899 | Oil on canvas | 38.5 × 46.5 cm | St. Petersburg | Hermitage Museum | |
| | Study of a Nude | | 1899 | Oil on canvas | 65.5 × 60 cm | Tokyo | Bridgestone Museum of Art | |
| | Still Life with Compote, Apples and Orange | | 1899 | Oil on canvas | 46.7 × 55.6 cm | Baltimore | The Cone Collection, Baltimore Museum of Art | |
| | Still Life with Oranges II | | 1899 | Oil on canvas | 46.7 × 55.2 cm | Saint Louis, Missouri | Mildred Lane Kemper Art Museum | |
| | Crockery on a Table | | 1900 | Oil on canvas | 97 × 82 cm | St. Petersburg | Hermitage Museum | |
| | Male Nude | | 1900 | Oil on canvas | | New York City | Museum of Modern Art | |
| | Self Portrait | | 1900 | Oil on canvas | 64 × 54 cm | | Private collection | |
| | Standing Model | | 1900–01 | Oil on canvas | 73 × 54 cm | London | Tate Gallery | |
| | Dishes and Fruit | | 1901 | Oil on canvas | 51 × 61.5 cm | St. Petersburg | Hermitage Museum | |
| | The Japanese | | 1901 | Oil on canvas | 116.8 × 80 cm | | Private collection | |
| | The Luxembourg Gardens | | 1901–02 | Oil on canvas | 59.5 × 81.5 cm | St. Petersburg | Hermitage Museum | |
| | Nude with a White Wash Towel | | 1902–03 | Oil on canvas | 81 × 59.5 cm | New York City | Gifford Phillips Collection | |
| | Studio under the Eaves | | 1903 | Oil on canvas | | Cambridge, United Kingdom | Fitzwilliam Museum | |
| | Saint-Michel Bridge | Pont Saint-Michel | 1904 | Oil on canvas | | | Scott M. Black Collection | |
| | Nude (Carmelita) | Nu (Carmelita) | 1904 | Oil on canvas | 81.3 x 59 cm | Boston | Museum of Fine Arts, Boston | |
| | Study for Luxury, Calm, and Desire | Study for "Luxe, calme et volupté" | 1904 | Oil on canvas | 32.2 × 40.5 cm | New York City | Museum of Modern Art | |
| | Luxury, Calm, and Desire | Luxe, Calme, et Volupté | 1904 | Oil on canvas | 98.5 x 118.5 cm | Paris | Musée d'Orsay | |
| | Still Life with Vase, Bottle and Fruit | | 1903–06 | Oil on canvas | 73 × 92 cm | St. Petersburg | Hermitage Museum | |
| | A Glimpse of Notre-Dame in the Late Afternoon | Notre-Dame, une fin d'après-midi | 1902 | Oil on paper mounted on canvas | 72.39 × 54.61 cm | Buffalo, New York | Albright-Knox Art Gallery | |
| | Pastoral (painting) | | 1905 | | 46 × 55 cm. | Paris | Musée d'Art Moderne de la Ville de Paris | |
| | The Green Stripe | La Raie Verte | 1905 | Oil and tempera on canvas | 40.50 × 32.5 cm | Copenhagen | Statens Museum for Kunst | |
| | The Open Window | La Fenêtre ouverte | 1905 | Oil on canvas | 55.3 × 46 cm | Washington, D.C. | National Gallery of Art | |
| | Woman with a Hat | La femme au chapeau | 1905 | Oil on canvas | 79.4 × 59.7 cm | San Francisco | San Francisco Museum of Modern Art | |
| | View of Collioure | Les toits de Collioure | 1905 | Oil on canvas | 59.5 × 73 cm | St. Petersburg | Hermitage Museum | |
| | Landscape at Collioure | | 1905 | Oil on canvas | 38.8 × 46.6 cm | New York City | Museum of Modern Art | |
| | View of Collioure (The Tower) | | 1905 | Oil on canvas | 32.9 × 41.3 cm | | Private collection | |
| | Portrait of André Derain | | 1905 | Oil on canvas | 39.5 × 29 cm | London | Tate Gallery | |
| | The Red Carpet | Le Tapis rouge (Intérieur au tapis rouge) | 1906 | Oil on canvas | 89 x 116 cm | Grenoble | Museum of Grenoble | |
| | The Reader | Portrait de Marguerite | 1906 | Oil on canvas | 64.5 x 80.3 cm | Grenoble | Museum of Grenoble | |
| | Portrait of Marguerite | Portrait de Marguerite | 1906 | Oil on canvas | 32 x 24 cm | | Marion Smooke Collection | |
| | Interior at Collioure | | 1906 | Oil on canvas | 60 × 78 cm | | Private collection | |
| | The Joy of Life | Le bonheur de vivre | 1905–06 | Oil on canvas | 175 × 241 cm | Philadelphia, Pennsylvania | Barnes Foundation | |
| | The Young Sailor I | | 1906 | Oil on canvas | 99 × 77.5 cm | | Private collection | |
| | The Young Sailor II | | 1906 | Oil on canvas | 101.6 × 81.9 cm | New York City | Metropolitan Museum of Art | |
| | Self-Portrait in a Striped T-shirt | | 1906 | Oil on canvas | 30 × 23 cm | Copenhagen | Statens Museum for Kunst | |
| | Portrait de Marguerite | | 1906–07 | Oil on canvas | 65 × 54 cm | Paris | Musée Picasso | |
| | Blue Nude (Souvenir de Biskra) | Nu bleu: Souvenir de Biskra | 1907 | Oil on canvas | 92 × 140 cm | Baltimore | Baltimore Museum of Art | |
| | Blue Still Life | Nature morte bleue | 1907 | Oil on canvas | 89.5 x 116.8 cm | Merion, PA | Barnes Foundation | |
| | The Red Madras Headress | Madras Rouge | 1907 | Oil on canvas | 99.4 × 80.5 cm | Philadelphia, Pennsylvania | Barnes Foundation | |
| | The coiffure | La coiffure | 1907 | Oil on canvas | 116 × 89 cm | Stuttgart | Staatsgalerie | |
| | Three Bathers | Les trois baigneuses | 1907 | Oil on canvas | 60.3 × 73 cm | Minneapolis | Minneapolis Institute of Arts | |
| | La Luxe II | Le Luxe II | 1907-1908 | Oil on canvas | 209.5 × 139 cm | Copenhagen | National Gallery of Denmark | |
| | La Bronze | Sculpure et vase persan bleau | 1908 | Oil on canvas | 60.5 × 73 cm | Oslo | National Museum of Norway | |
| | Statuette and Vases on Oriental Carpet (Still Life in Red of Venice) | | 1908 | Oil on canvas | 89 × 105 cm | Moscow | Pushkin Museum | |
| | L'Ilyssus du Parthénon | | 1908 | Oil on canvas | 61 × 73 cm | | | |
| | The Dessert: Harmony in Red (The Red Room) | | 1908 | Oil on canvas | 180 × 220 cm | St. Petersburg | Hermitage Museum | |
| | Game of Bowls | | 1908 | Oil on canvas | 115 × 147 cm | St. Petersburg | Hermitage Museum | |
| | Bathers with a Turtle | | 1908 | Oil on canvas | 179 × 220 cm | St. Louis, Missouri | Saint Louis Art Museum | |
| | Seated Woman | | 1908 | Oil on canvas | 80.5 × 52 cm | Moscow | Hermitage Museum | |
| | Portrait of Greta Moll | Portrait de Greta Moll | 1908 | Oil on canvas | 93 × 73.5 cm | London | Tate Modern | |
| | Algerian Woman | L'Algérienne | 1909 | Oil on canvas | 81 × 650 cm | Paris | Musée National d'Art Moderne | |
| | Spanish Woman with a Tambourine | L'Espagnole | 1909 | Oil on canvas | 92 x 73 cm | Moscow | Pushkin Museum | |
| | Nude with a White Scarf | Nu à l'écharpe blanche | 1909 | Oil on canvas | 116.5 x 89 cm | Copenhagen | Statens Museum for Kunst | |
| | Dance (I) | La Danse (I) | 1909 | Oil on canvas | 260 × 390 cm | New York City | Museum of Modern Art | |
| | Still Life with Dance | | 1909 | Oil on canvas | 89.5 × 117.5 cm | St Petersburg | Hermitage Museum | |
| | Dance II | La Danse | 1910 | Oil on canvas | 260 × 391 cm | St Petersburg | Hermitage Museum | |
| | Music | La Musique | 1910 | Oil on canvas | 260 × 389 cm | St Petersburg | Hermitage Museum | |
| | Nasturtiums with The Dance II | Les Capucines | 1910–12 | Oil on canvas | 193 x 114 cm | Moscow | Pushkin Museum | |
| | Still Life with Geraniums | | 1910 | Oil on canvas | 180 × 220 cm | Munich | Pinakothek der Moderne | |
| | Fruits and Bronze | | 1910 | Oil on canvas | 90 × 118 cm | Moscow | Pushkin Museum | |
| | The Red Studio | L'Atelier Rouge | 1911 | Oil on canvas | 162 × 130 cm | New York City | Museum of Modern Art | |
| | Painter's Family | Portrait de la famille du peintre | 1911 | Oil on canvas | 143 × 196 cm | St. Petersburg | Hermitage Museum | |
| | The Cowslips, Blue and Rose Fabric | Les coucous, tapis bleu et rose | 1911 | Oil on canvas | 81 × 65.5 cm | | Private collection | |
| | The Conversation | | 1908–12 | | | | | |
| | Window at Tangier (Landscape viewed from a window, Tangiers) | Fenêtre à Tanger | 1911–12 | Oil on canvas | 115 x 80 cm | Moscow | | |
| | Moroccan Landscape (Acanthus) | Paysage marocain (Acanthes) | 1912 | Oil on canvas | 115 x 80 cm | Stockholm | Moderna Museet | |
| | Goldfish | Les Poissons rouges | 1912 | Oil on canvas | 146 x 97 cm | Moscow | Pushkin Museum of Fine Arts | |
| | Zorah on the Terrace | | 1912 | Oil on canvas | 116 × 100 cm. | Moscow | Pushkin Museum of Fine Arts | |
| | Seated Riffian | Le Rifain assis | 1912–13 | Oil on canvas | 200 × 160 cm. | Philadelphia, Pennsylvania | Barnes Foundation | |
| | Arab Coffeehouse | Le café Maure | 1912–13 | Oil on canvas | 176 x 210 cm | Saint Petersburg | Hermitage Museum | |
| | Portrait of the Artist's Wife | Portrait de la femme de l'artiste | 1913 | Oil on canvas | 146 x 97.7 cm | Saint Petersburg | Hermitage Museum | |
| | The Blue Window | La glace sans tain | 1913 | Oil on canvas | 130.8 x 90.5 cm | New York | Museum of Modern Art | |
| | Interior with a Goldfish Bowl | Intérieur, bocal de poissons rouges | 1914 | Oil on canvas | 147 x 97 cm | Paris | Centre Georges Pompidou | |
| | Woman on a High Stool | Femme au tabouret | 1914 | Oil on canvas | 147 × 95.5 cm | New York City | Museum of Modern Art | |
| | French Window at Collioure | Porte-fenêtre à Collioure | 1914 | Oil on canvas | 46 × 35½ in | Paris | Centre Pompidou | |
| | View of Notre-Dame | Une vue de Notre-Dame | 1914 | Oil on canvas | 147.3 × 94.3 cm | New York City | Museum of Modern Art | |
| | Still Life with Lemons | Le citron | 1914 | Oil on canvas | 70.2 × 53.8 cm | Rhode Island | Rhode Island School of Design Museum | |
| | The Yellow Curtain | Le rideau jaune | 1915 | Oil on canvas | 146 × 97 cm | New York City | Museum of Modern Art | |
| | Still life with Fruits | Nature morte aux fruits | 1915 | | | Karlsruhe, Germany | Staatliche Kunsthalle Karlsruhe | |
| | Sculpture and Vase of Ivy | La branche de lierre | 1916 | Oil on canvas | 60 x 73 cm | Besançon | Musée de Besançon | |
| | The Window | La Fenêtre | 1916 | Oil on canvas | 146.1 x 116.8 cm | Detroit | Detroit Institute of Arts | |
| | Laurette in a Green Robe | Laurette sur fond noir, robe verte | 1916 | Oil on canvas | 73 × 54.3 cm | New York City | Metropolitan Museum of Art | |
| | Still Life with Gourd | Nature morte aux coloquintes | 1916 | Oil on canvas | 100 x 83.1 cm | Merion, PA | Barnes Foundation | |
| | Studio, Quai Saint-Michel | | 1916 | Oil on canvas | 147.9 × 116.8 cm | Washington D.C. | The Phillips Collection | |
| | Auguste Pellerin II | Auguste Pellerin II | 1916–17 | Oil on canvas | 150.2 x 96.2 cm | Paris | Centre Georges Pompidou | |
| | The Painter and His Model | Le Peintre dans son atelier | 1916–17 | Oil on canvas | 146.5 x 97 cm | Paris | Centre Georges Pompidou | |
| | Sleeping Nude on a Red Background | Nu (Lorette allongée sur fond rouge) | 1916–17 | Oil on canvas | 95 x 196 cm | | Private collection | |
| | The Music Lesson | Portrait de famille | 1917 | Oil on canvas | 245.1 x 210.8 cm | Merion, PA | Barnes Foundation | |
| | Lorette | Tête de Jeune Fille | 1917 | Oil on canvas | 34.9 x 26.5 cm | Richmond, VA | Virginia Museum of Fine Arts | |
| | Lorette | Tête de Femme | 1917 | Oil on canvas | 34.9 x 26.5 cm | Richmond, VA | Virginia Museum of Fine Arts | |
| | Bouquet | Fleurs | 1917–18 | Oil on canvas | 139.7 x 102.2 cm | San Diego | San Diego Museum of Art | |
| | The Moroccans | Les Marocains | 1918 | Oil on canvas | 181.3 x 279.4 cm | New York City | Museum of Modern Art | |
| | The Ostrich-Feather Hat | La toque de gouro | 1918 | Oil on canvas | | Hartford, CT | Wadsworth Atheneum | |
| | Portrait of George Besson | Portrait de George Besson | 1918 | Oil on wood panel | 14 x 8 cm | Besançon | Musée de Besançon | |
| | Self-portrait | Portrait du peintre | 1918 | Oil on canvas | 65 x 54 cm | Le Cateau-Cambrésis | Matisse Museum (Le Cateau) | |
| | Interior with a Violin | Interieur au violon | 1918 | Oil on canvas | 89 x 116 cm | Copenhagen | Statens Museum for Kunst | |
| | Interior | La Fenêtre Fermée | 1918–19 | Oil on canvas | 53.9 x 44.4 cm | Richmond, VA | Virginia Museum of Fine Arts | |
| | White Plumes | Les plumes blanches | 1919 | Oil on canvas | 72 x 59 cm | Minneapolis | Minneapolis Institute of Art | |
| | Woman with a Red Umbrella Seated in Profile | Interieur | 1919–21 | Oil on canvas | 81 x 65 cm | | Private collection | |
| | Étretat (The Eel) | Étretat (Le Congre) | 1920 | Oil on canvas | 90.2 x 71.1 cm | Ohio | Columbus Museum of Art | |
| | Intérieur à Nice | | 1920 | Oil on canvas | | | | |
| | Odalisque | Odalisque | 1920–21 | Oil on canvas | 61.4 x 74.4 cm | Amsterdam | Stedelijk Museum | |
| | Odalisque with Raised Arms | Odalisque assise aux bras levés, fauteuil rayé vert | 1923 | Oil on canvas | 68 × 64 cm | Washington, D.C. | National Gallery of Art | |
| | Still Life with Pascal’s Pensées | | 1924 | Oil on canvas | 48.9 x 63.8 cm | Minnesota | Minneapolis Institute of Art | |
| | Yellow Odalisque | | 1926 | Oil on canvas | | Ottawa | National Gallery of Canada | |
| | The Garden of Renoir in Cagnes | Le Jardin de Renoir à Cagnes | 1927-28 | Oil on canvas | | Algiers | National Museum of Fine Arts Algiers | |
| | Two Odalisques, One Being Nude, Ornamental Ground and Checkerboard | Deux odalisques dont l'une dévetue, fond ornemental et damier | 1928 | Oil on canvas | 54 × 65 cm | Stockholm | Moderna Museet | |
| | The Dance II | | 1932 | Mural | 355.9 cm × 1,384 cm (11 ft 8.1 in × 45 ft 4.9 in) | Pennsylvania | Barnes Foundation | (Note: The dimensions value represents the maximum height and summed width of the dimensions provided for each panel on the museum website, which are left panel: 339.7 cm × 441.3 cm (11.15 ft × 14.48 ft); center panel: 355.9 cm × 503.2 cm (11.68 ft × 16.51 ft); right panel: 338.8 cm × 439.4 cm (11.12 ft × 14.42 ft).) |
| | Interior with Dog | Interior avec un Chien | 1934 | Oil on canvas | | Baltimore | Baltimore Museum of Art | |
| | The Embroidered Dark Blouse (Woman in Red Chair) | Femme a la chaise rouge | 1936 | Oil on canvas | 35.2 × 24.1 cm | Baltimore | Baltimore Museum of Art | |
| | Purple Robe and Anemones | Robe violette et Anémones | 1937 | Oil on canvas | 73 × 60 cm | Baltimore | Baltimore Museum of Art | |
| (Image) (Note: Copyrighted works are protected in the United States for 95 years after creation (during and after 1930 as of 2025). Unlike many countries where work passes into the public domain 70 years after the author's death, works less than 95 years old are not in the public domain according to United States Copyright law and are used here under a provision of fair use, a common law doctrine that allows certain limited use outside of what would normally be allowed for a copyrighted work. "Fair use" always applies to a particular permitted use, rather than being a statue of the copyrighted work as such.) | Woman in a Purple Coat | | 1937 | Oil on canvas | 81 × 65.2 cm | Houston, Texas | Museum of Fine Arts | |
| | The Dream of 1940 | Le Rêve de 1940 | 1940 | Oil on canvas | | | | |
| | La Blouse Roumaine | La Blouse Roumaine | 1940 | Oil on canvas | 92 x 73 cm | Paris | Centre Pompidou | |
| | Young Woman Lying on a White Fur | Jeune femme à la pelisse blanche | 1944 | Oil on canvas | 73 × 60 cm | Grenoble | Museum of Grenoble | |
| (Image) | Annelies, White Tulips and Anemones | | 1944 | Oil on canvas | 60 × 73 cm | Honolulu | Honolulu Museum of Art | |
| | Young Woman in White on a Red Background | Jeune femme en blanc, fond rouge | 1946 | Oil on canvas | 92 x 73 cm | Lyon | Museum of Fine Arts of Lyon | |
| (Image) | Asia | L'Asie | 1946 | Oil on canvas | 116 × 81 cm | | Private collection | |
| (Image) | Two Girls in a Yellow and Red Interior | Deux fillettes, fond jaune et rouge | 1947 | Oil on canvas | 61 × 49.8 cm | Philadelphia, Pennsylvania | Barnes Foundation | |
| | Blue Interior With Two Girls | | 1947 | Oil on canvas | 34 3/8 x 29 3/4 in. (87.31 x 75.57 cm) | Iowa City, Iowa | Stanley Museum of Art | |
| (Image) | The Plum Blossoms | | 1948 | Oil on canvas | 115.9 × 88.9 cm | New York City | Museum of Modern Art | |

== Sculptures ==
Many of Matisse's sculptures were modeled in clay and later cast in bronze, a process which allows for multiple copies to be made. Because of that, many of these works exist in multiple copies and are in the collections of multiple museums.

| Work | Name | French name | Year | Technique | Height | City | Gallery | Notes |
|---|---|---|---|---|---|---|---|---|
| | The Serf | | 1900–04 | Bronze | 92.3 cm | New York City | Museum of Modern Art | |
| | Madeleine I | Madeleine I | 1901 | Bronze | 59.7 cm | Minneapolis | Minneapolis Institute of Arts | |
| | Madeleine II | Madeleine II | 1903 | Bronze | 59.1 cm | New York City | Metropolitan Museum of Art | |
| | The Serf | Le Serf | 1906–07 | Bronze | | | | |
| | Sleep | | 1905 | Wood | | | | |
| | Reclining Nude, I | Nu couché, I (Aurore) | 1906–07 | Sculpture | | | | |
| | Awakening | | 1907 | Plaster | | | | |
| | | Figure décorative | 1908 | Bronze | | | | |
| (Image) | The Back I | | 1908–09 | Bronze | | New York City | Museum of Modern Art | |
| | Study of a foot | | c. 1909 | Bronze | 30 cm | St. Petersburg | Hermitage | |
| (Image) | The Back II | | 1913 | Bronze | | New York City | Museum of Modern Art | |
| (Image) | The Back III | | 1916 | Bronze | | New York City | Museum of Modern Art | |
| | Henriette II | Henriette II | 1927 | Bronze | 32.1 cm | Ottawa | National Gallery of Canada | |
| | Henriette III | Henriette III | 1929 | Bronze | 40 cm | St. Petersburg | Hermitage Museum | |
| (Image) | The Back IV | | c. 1931 | Bronze | | New York City | Museum of Modern Art | |

== Works on paper ==
| Work | Name | French name | Year | Technique | Dimensions | City | Gallery | Notes |
|---|---|---|---|---|---|---|---|---|
| | Magnolia | | c. 1900 | Pen and ink on paper | 20.9 × 25.7 cm | | Private Collection | |
| | Still Life | Nature morte | 1900 | Brush and ink on paper | 19.5 × 23 cm | | Musée Matisse | |
| | Seated Nude | | 1907 | Graphite on wove paper | 31.91 cm x 24.13 cm | Ann Arbor | University of Michigan Museum of Art | |
| | Head of a Man, Flowered Background | Tête d'homme, fond fleuri | 1914 | Etching on paper | 24.4 x 19.4 cm | Ann Arbor | University of Michigan Museum of Art | |
| | Irene - Face | Irène - Masque | 1914 | Etching on chine collé | 8.25 cm x 5.72 cm | Ann Arbor | University of Michigan Museum of Art | |
| | | Odalisque à la culotte rayée, reflectée dans la glace | 1923 | Lithograph on paper | 63.82 cm x 47.63 cm | Ann Arbor | University of Michigan Museum of Art | |
| | Dancer, from the series Ten Dancers (Dix Danseuses) | | 1925–26 | Lithograph on paper | 32.7 cm x 50.48 cm | Ann Arbor | University of Michigan Museum of Art | |
| | Dancer, from the series Ten Dancers (Dix Danseuses) | | 1925–26 | Lithograph on paper | 32.7 cm x 50.48 cm | Ann Arbor | University of Michigan Museum of Art | |
| | Dancer in wooden armchair, from the series Ten Dancers (Dix Danseuses) | | 1925–26 | Lithograph on paper | 50.48 cm x 32.7 cm | Ann Arbor | University of Michigan Museum of Art | |
| | Dancer, from the series Ten Dancers (Dix Danseuses) | | 1925–26 | Lithograph on paper | 50.48 cm x 32.7 cm | Ann Arbor | University of Michigan Museum of Art | |
| | Figure Asleep | | 1927 | Lithograph on paper | 40.01 cm x 49.53 cm | Ann Arbor | University of Michigan Museum of Art | |
| | Dancer, from the series Ten Dancers (Dix Danseuses) | | 1927 | Lithograph on paper | 32.7 cm x 50.17 cm | Ann Arbor | University of Michigan Museum of Art | |
| | Seated Orientale, Veil on her Head | Orientale assise, voile sur la tête | 1929 | Drypoint on chine applique, mounted on Arches paper | 15.56 cm x 10.95 cm | Ann Arbor | University of Michigan Museum of Art | |
| | Figure in a coat | Figure au manteau | 1935 | Charcoal | | Canberra | NGA | |
| | Gertrude Bell | | 1936 | Brush and pencil on paper | 14 × 22 cm | Las Vegas | Private collection | |
| | Untitled (Female Head) | | 1936 | Pen and black ink on light cream wove paper | 50.01 cm x 31.75 cm | Ann Arbor | University of Michigan Museum of Art | |
| | Teeny | | 1938 | Linoleum block print on paper | 30.3 cm x 22.7 cm | Ann Arbor | University of Michigan Museum of Art | |
| | Romanian Blouse | Blouse romaine | 1938 | Charcoal | | Canberra | NGA | |
| | Drawing of a Woman | Dessin d'une femme | 1944 | Pen and ink on paper | 55 × 34 cm | Bogotá | Botero Museum | |
| | Portrait of Paul Matise | | 1946 | Charcoal | | Canberra | NGA | |
| (Image) | The Knife Thrower | Le Lanceur De Couteaux | 1947 | Collage/Decoupage/Paper-cut | | Houston | Menil Collection | |
| | Head of a Woman, from 'Les miroirs profonds: Henri Matisse', Paris, Pierre à Feu | | 1947 | Wood engraving on paper | 24.13 cm x 20 cm | Ann Arbor | University of Michigan Museum of Art | |
| | Pierre à Feu, bookcover for "Les miroirs profonds: Henri Matisse", Paris, Pierre | | 1947 | Color lithograph on paper | 24.29 cm x 20.96 cm | Ann Arbor | University of Michigan Museum of Art | |
| | Head | | prior to 1948 | Etching on paper | 33 cm x 25.1 cm | Ann Arbor | University of Michigan Museum of Art | |
| | Untitled [from Poésies de mots inconnus] | | 1949 | Linocut in red on dark cream paper | 31.59 cm x 23.81 cm | Ann Arbor | University of Michigan Museum of Art | |
| | Untitled [from Poésies de mots inconnus] | | 1949 | Linocut in blue on dark cream paper | 32.23 cm x 23.81 cm | Ann Arbor | University of Michigan Museum of Art | |
| (Image) | Beasts of the Sea | Les bêtes de la mer | 1950 | Paper collage on canvas | 295.5 × 154 cm | Washington, D.C. | National Gallery of Art | |
| | Exhibition Poster: Affiches d'Exposition...1952-1953 | | 1952 | Color lithograph on paper | 64.5 cm x 49.7 cm | Ann Arbor | University of Michigan Museum of Art | |
| (Image) | Black Leaf on Green Background | Feuille noire sur fond vert | 1952 | Gouache decoupage | | Houston | Menil Collection | |
| (Image) | Blue Nude II | Nu bleu II | 1952 | Gouache-painted paper cut-outs stuck to paper mounted on canvas | 116.2 × 88.9 cm | Paris | Centre Pompidou | |
| (Image) | The Black Woman | La Négresse | 1952/3 | gouache découpée | 55.3 × 46 cm | Paris | Centre Pompidou | |
| (Image) | The Sorrows of the King | La Tristesse du roi | 1952 | Gouache | 292 × 386 cm | Paris | Centre Pompidou | |
| (Image) | The Snail | L'Escargot | 1953 | Gouache | 287 × 288 cm | London | Tate Gallery | |
| (Image) | The Boat | Le Bateau | 1953 | Gouache | 13.84 × 10.33 cm | New York City | Museum of Modern Art | |
| | Rose Window | La Rosace | 1954 | Gouache, pencil, and paper cut-out on paper, laid on canvas | 109 × 109.4 cm | London | The Brian Clarke Collection of Stained Glass | |

== Bibliography ==
- Cowart, Jack; Dominique Fourcade (1986). Henri Matisse: The Early Years in Nice 1916–1930. Washington, D.C.: National Gallery of Art. ISBN 0-89468-097-8.
- Elderfield, John (1996). Henri Matisse: Masterworks from the Museum of Modern Art. New York City: Museum of Modern Art. ISBN 0-87070-112-6.
- Antonioz, Michael; Berggruen, Olivier; Böhringer, Hannes; Labrusse, Rémi; et al. (2006) Henri Matisse: Drawing With Scissors: Masterpieces from the Late Years Edited by Olivier Berggruen and Max Hollein, translated from the German edition of 2003 by Paul Aston. New York City: Prestel Verlag. ISBN 978-3-7913-3473-8.
- Henri Matisse Art Poster
