= The Plum Blossoms =

1948 painting by Henri Matisse

- Artist: Henri Matisse
- Year: 1948
- Catalogue: 99673
- Medium: Oil on canvas
- Dimensions: 115.9 cm × 88.9 cm (45.6 in × 35 in)
- Location: Museum of Modern Art; New York
- Accession: PG642.2005

The Plum Blossoms is a 1948 painting by Henri Matisse. It is held in the Museum of Modern Art, in New York.

== Provenance ==
On September 8, 2005, it was purchased for New York's Museum of Modern Art by Henry Kravis and the new president of the museum, Marie-Josée Drouin. Previously, it had not been seen by the public since 1970.

== Late-period Matisse ==
The Plum Blossoms is an example of one of the final group of oil paintings in Matisse's career.

== See also ==
- List of works by Henri Matisse
