= Self-Portrait in a Striped T-shirt =

1906 painting by Henri Matisse

Self-Portrait
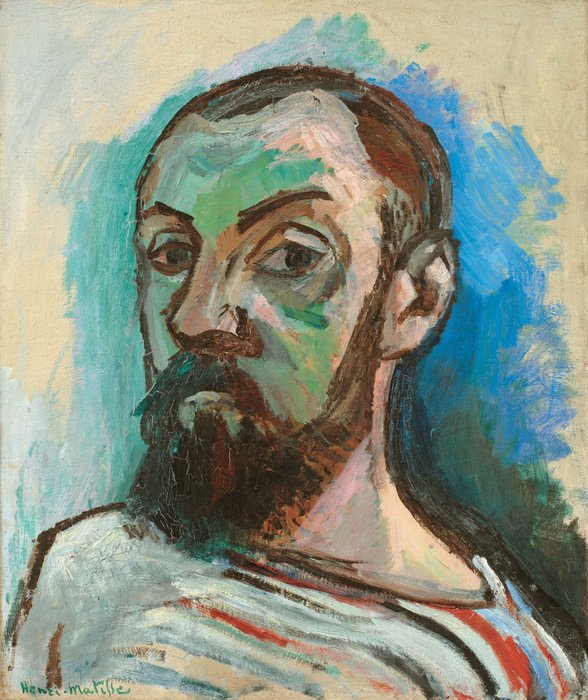
- Artist: Henri Matisse
- Year: 1906
- Medium: Oil on canvas
- Dimensions: 55 cm × 46 cm (22 in × 18 in)
- Location: Statens Museum for Kunst; Copenhagen

Self-Portrait in a Striped T-shirt (1906) is an oil on canvas painting by Henri Matisse from his Fauvism period, in the collection of Statens Museum for Kunst, Copenhagen, Denmark.

== See also ==
- List of works by Henri Matisse
