= La Négresse =

Painting by Henri Matisse

- Artist: Henri Matisse
- Year: 1952–53
- Type: Cut paper painted with gouache
- Dimensions: 453.9 cm × 623.3 cm (178 11/16 in × 245 3/8 in)
- Location: National Gallery of Art, Washington, D.C.

La Négresse (1952–53) by Henri Matisse is a gouache découpée, made of cut pieces of colored paper.

== Medium ==
Starting in the 1930s, Matisse began to experiment with creating art by cutting paper into shapes. By 1950, he had primarily shifted to this mode of art making, perhaps because his health and disabilities made painting on a large scale difficult. These "cut-outs" were often mural-sized and made from pieces of paper painted with gouache.

La Négresse was first pinned onto the wall at his apartment in Nice, France around 1952. He rearranged the composition until early 1953. It takes up an entire wall. A newspaper review called the figure "a giantess."

== Subject or Inspiration ==
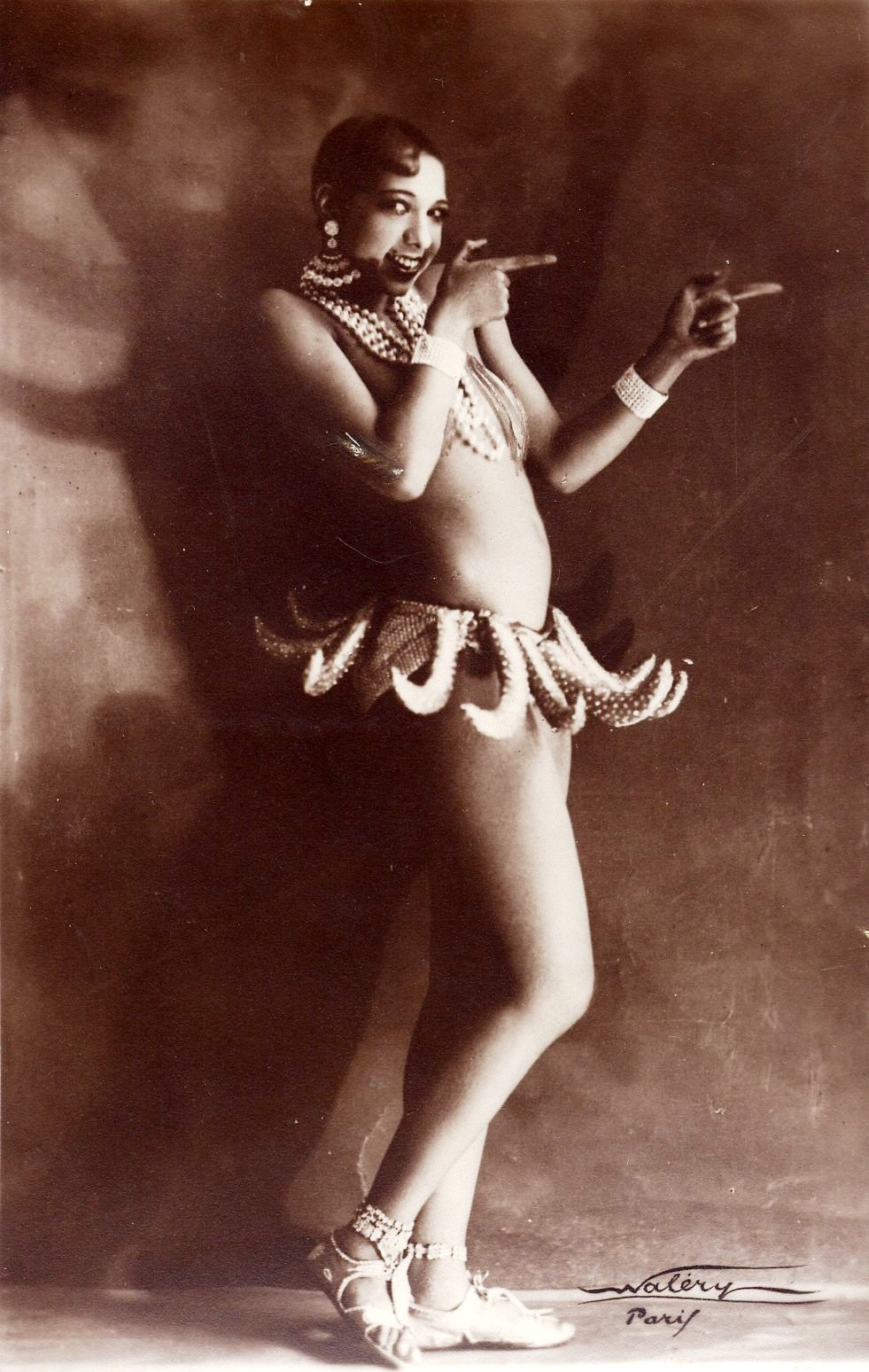
Josephine Baker in the banana skirt, 1927.

La Négresse may be inspired by Josephine Baker, a black American dancer whose popularity reached its height in Paris during the 1920s and 1930s. One of Baker's famous outfits was a skirt made from bananas, which Matisse may be invoking in the orange-yellow forms around the figure's waist. Baker's association with jazz music may have also inspired Matisse, who had previously designed a book titled Jazz (1947). Matisse's depiction has been criticized as reiterating "racialized clichés in the enlarged belly and hips." Others have proposed that Matisse presented black women as beautiful.

Other scholars propose that the figure may be of another famous dancer, Yvette Chauviré. Matisse had created an earlier work about a dancer (Creole Dancer, 1950) that art critic Louis Aragon identified as Katherine Dunham, who Matisse had seen perform. The work may also be an imagined dancer or amalgamation of the previously discussed figures.

== Reception ==
The work has been praised as "the culmination of Matisse's art." It was acquired by the National Gallery of Art in 1973.

In 2018, the work was referenced in the title of Denise Murrell's exhibition and catalog Posing Modernity: the Black Model from Manet to Matisse.

== See also ==
- List of works by Henri Matisse
