= Window at Tangier =

1912 painting by Henri Matisse

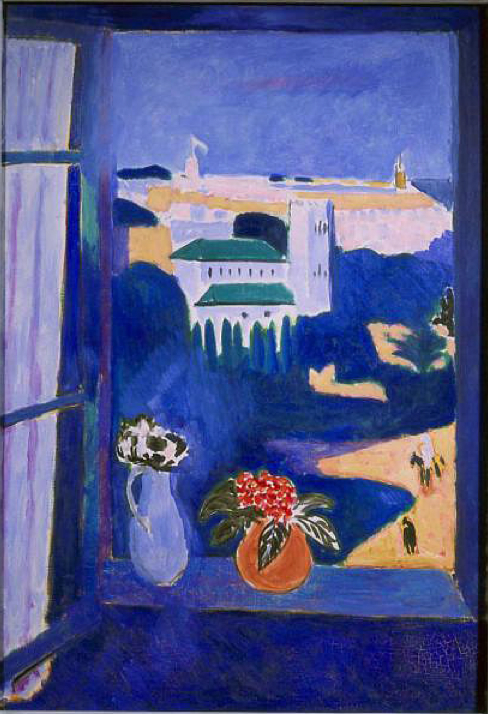
- Artist: Henri Matisse
- Year: 1912
- Medium: Oil on canvas
- Dimensions: 115 cm × 80 cm (45.3 in × 31.5 in)
- Location: Pushkin Museum of Fine Arts; Moscow

Window at Tangier; also referred to as La Fenêtre à Tanger, Paysage vu d'une fenêtre, and Landscape viewed from a window, Tangiers, is a painting by Henri Matisse, executed in 1912. It is held at the Pushkin Museum of Fine Arts, Moscow.

An example of Matisse's paintings after the colorful revolution of his Fauvism period. After several trips outside France Matisse became interested in the Islamic art of North Africa. He visited Morocco in 1912 and 1913. Window in Tangier, with its bold color and flat perspective reflects a Moroccan influence in Matisse's work.

The painting depicts the view from Matisse's bedroom in the Hotel de France in Tangier, Morocco, with St Andrew's Church seen in the distance.

This was among several works acquired directly from Matisse in Paris by the Russian collector Ivan Morozov. After the Russian Revolution the Morozov collection was confiscated and eventually by 1948 the collection was donated to the public along with the Sergei Shchukin collection, at the Pushkin Museum of Fine Arts in Moscow and the Hermitage in St Petersburg.

Window at Tangier, together with the paintings Zorah on the Terrace and Entrance to the Kasbah, are sometimes referred to as the "Moroccan Triptych". These three paintings were painted by Matisse during his second stay in Tangier.

== See also ==
- The Open Window (Matisse)
- List of works by Henri Matisse
