= Madras Rouge =

1907 painting by Henri Matisse

Madras Rouge (The Red Madras Headdress)
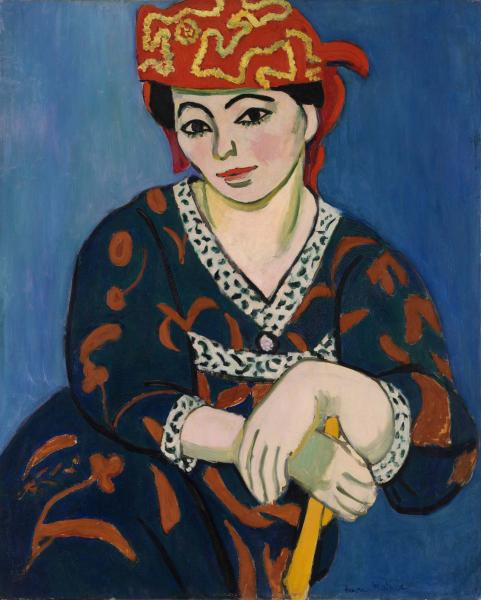
- Artist: Henri Matisse
- Year: 1907
- Medium: Oil on canvas
- Dimensions: 99.4 cm × 80.5 cm (39.1 in × 31.7 in)
- Location: Barnes Foundation; Philadelphia

Madras Rouge (The Red Madras Headdress) is a painting by Henri Matisse from 1907. The woman depicted is the painter's wife, Amélie Noellie Parayre Matisse. It is held in the Barnes Foundation, in Philadelphia.

The painting was illustrated in Gelett Burgess, "The Wild Men of Paris", Architectural Record, May 1910, New York.

External videos
- Barnes Takeout: Art Talk on Henri Matisse's Red Madras Headdress, 5:13, Barnes Foundation

== See also ==
- List of works by Henri Matisse
