= Purple Robe and Anemones =

Painting by Henri Matisse

La Blouse Roumaine
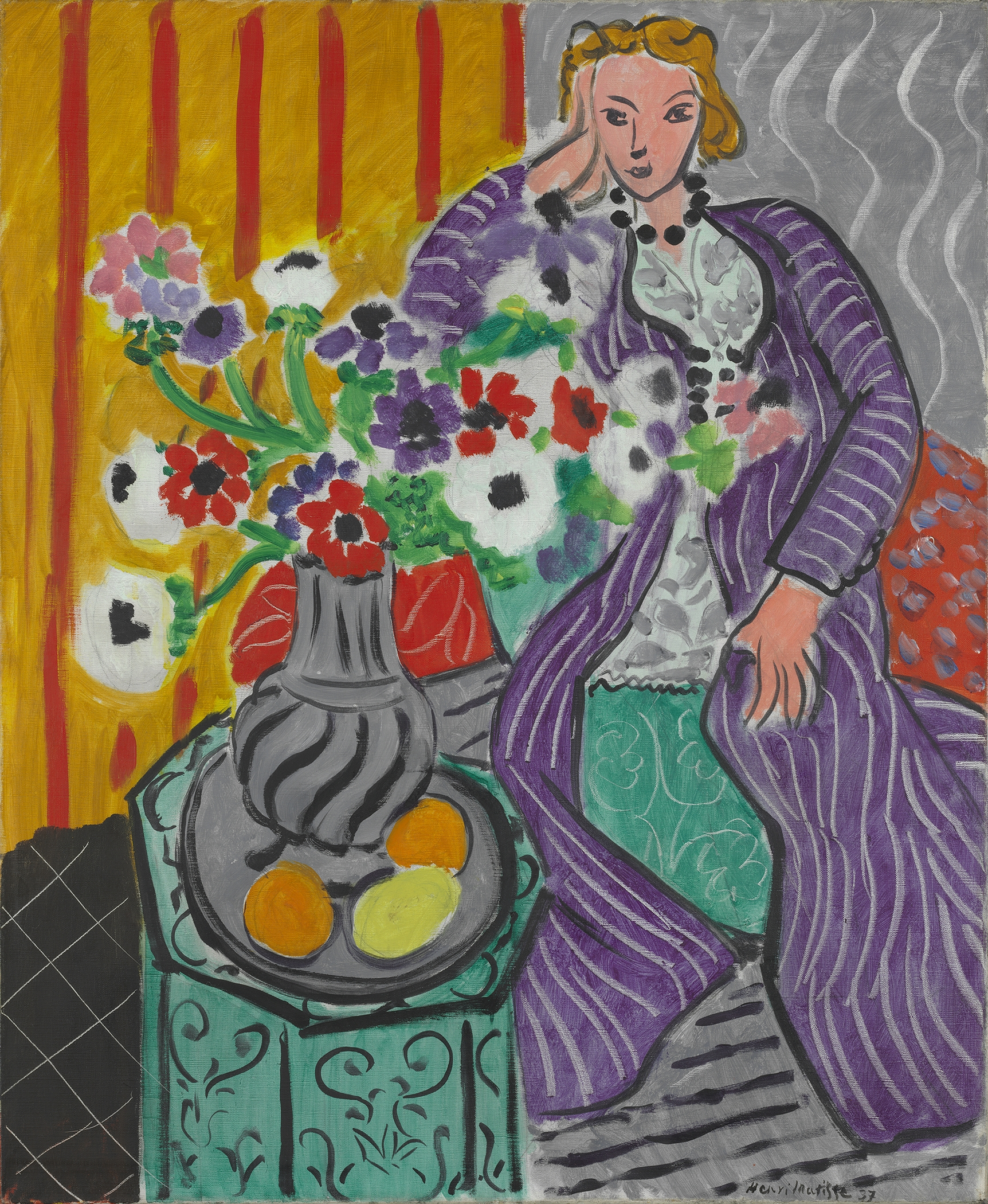
- Artist: Henri Matisse
- Year: 1937
- Medium: Oil on canvas
- Dimensions: 73 cm × 60 cm (29 in × 24 in)
- Location: Baltimore Museum of Art, Baltimore

Purple Robe and Anemones (French: Robe violette et Anémones) is a 1937 painting by Henri Matisse featuring a woman wearing a purple robe sitting next to a vase of anemones.

The painting is among those purchased by art collector and socialite Etta Cone and is part of the Cone Collection at Baltimore Museum of Art. The painting has been called "one of the best-loved pieces" of that collection, a collection estimated to be worth almost a billion dollars in 2002.

The painting has been described as showing "Henri Matisse's comprehensive use of space: not much is left empty, creating a rich viewing experience." It has also been said that it is "a great example of Matisse's use of flat areas of bold color and pattern", as the placement of overlapping objects creates a sense of space with simple lines, suggestive of volume.

== See also ==
- List of works by Henri Matisse
