= Young Woman in White on a Red Background =

Painting by Henri Matisse

- Jeune Femme en blanc, fond rouge (French)
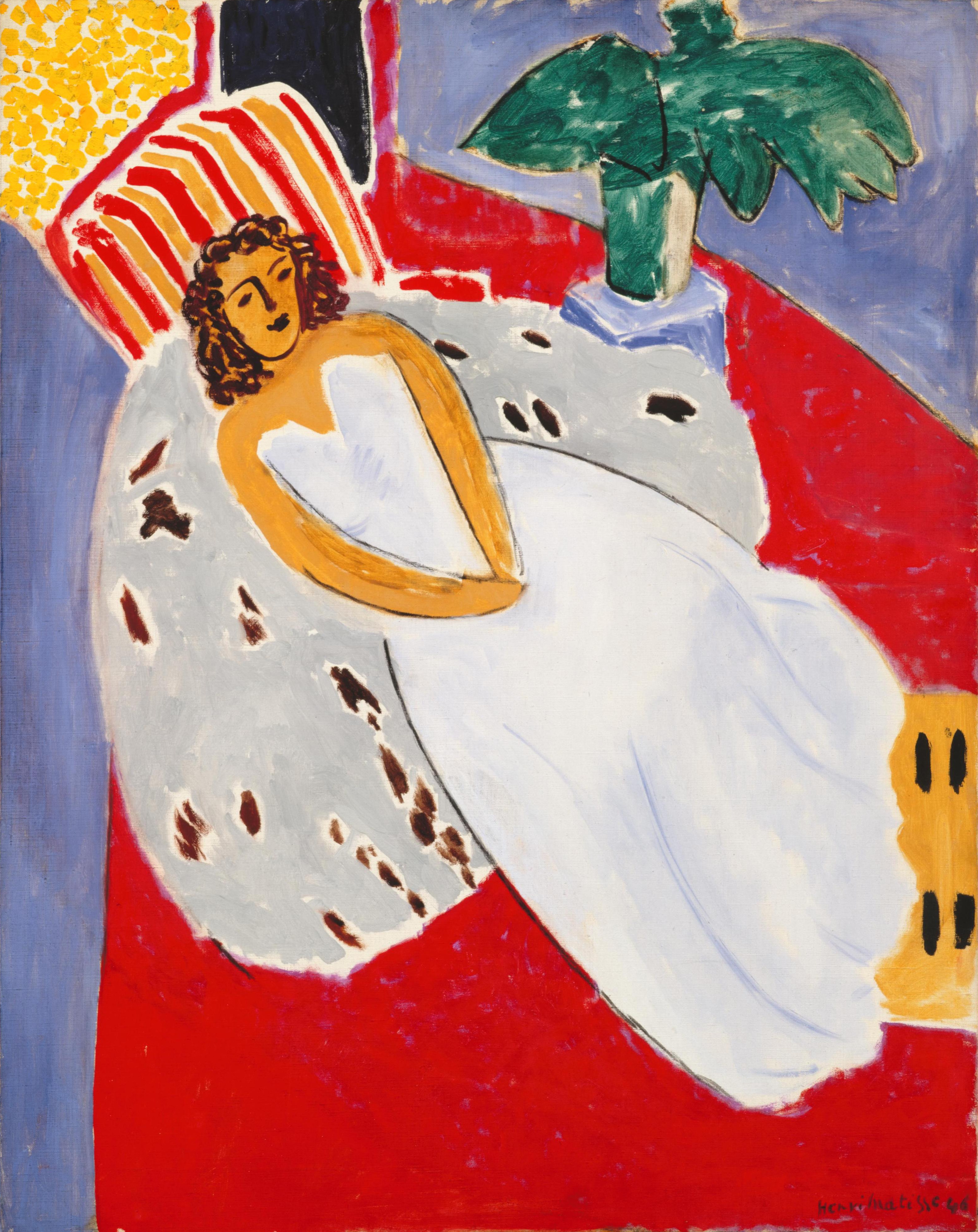
- Artist: Henri Matisse
- Year: 1946
- Medium: Oil on canvas
- Dimensions: 92 cm × 73 cm (36 in × 29 in)
- Location: Museum of Fine Arts of Lyon, Lyon

Young Woman in White on a Red Background (French: Jeune femme en blanc, fond rouge) is an oil on canvas painting by Henri Matisse, from c. 1946. It is held in the Museum of Fine Arts of Lyon.

It belongs to a cycle of paintings of interiors begun by Matisse in 1946 whilst in his villa Le Rêve at Vence (Alpes-Maritimes), just before working on the Chapelle du Rosaire de Vence.

== See also ==
- List of works by Henri Matisse

== Sources ==
- Museum collection
