= Black Leaf on Green Background =

1952 collage by Henri Matisse

- Artist: Henri Matisse
- Year: 1952
- Type: Gouache paint on paper
- Location: Menil Collection; Houston

Black Leaf on Green Background (1952) is a collage by Henri Matisse. The medium is gouache and cut paper on paper. It is in the Menil Collection, Houston, Texas. During the early-to-mid-1940s Matisse was in poor health, and by 1950 he stopped painting in favor of his paper cutouts. Black Leaf on Green Background is an example of Matisse's final body of works known as the cutouts.

== See also ==
- List of works by Henri Matisse
