= The Open Window (Bonnard) =

1921 painting by Pierre Bonnard

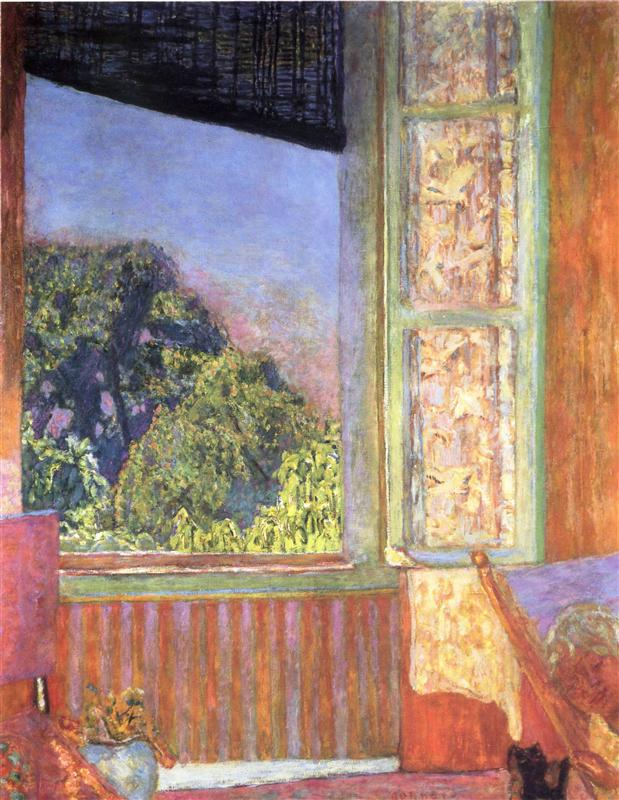
- Artist: Pierre Bonnard
- Year: 1921
- Type: Oil on canvas
- Dimensions: 118.11 cm × 95.885 cm (46.50 in × 37.750 in)
- Location: The Phillips Collection, Washington, D.C.

The Open Window is an oil-on-canvas painting by the French artist Pierre Bonnard, painted in 1921. Depicting a scene in a room, the painting draws the viewer's focus to the natural landscape outside of the window, away from the figures in the bottom right. The work is housed in The Phillips Collection in Washington, D.C.

== Subject and composition ==
The contrast between the exterior blues and greens and the interior red oranges keeps the viewer's focus away from the black cat and woman at the lower right corner of the canvas. Dogs and cats are a signature that are found in many of his works. It takes a while for the viewer to find the woman's head in chair. Her hair is palish blue like the canvas of the chair and her face the same red as the wall behind. This suggested human presence, like some figure in a dream, became a feature of these inside-outside views that Bonnard painted in the 1930s. The human figure is believed to be Bonnard's wife Marthe de Meligny but may also be Renee Monchaty, with whom he fell in love around 1917 and who killed herself in 1923. Many accounts describe Monchaty as being Bonnard's ideal statuesque model for his paintings.

Bonnard's work was painted from memory rather than from life, which accounts for the semi-realistic view of his paintings. Bonnard's studies of the domestic interior and its psychological charge, a reflection upon his private life, is evident in his work. In his interiors, a sense of longing is concentrated in open windows to the outside world. In The Open Window, color and light transfigure a room in the artist’s house in Normandy. The focal point of the painting is the void in the middle, the sky, the foliage, and the outside shadow enclosed by the window despite the painting giving more space to the walls.
