= Still Life with Geraniums =

1910 painting by Henri Matisse

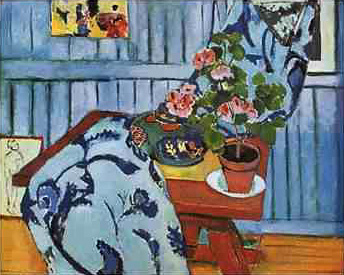
- Artist: Henri Matisse
- Year: 1910
- Medium: Oil on canvas
- Dimensions: 180 cm × 220 cm (70.9 in × 86.6 in)
- Location: Pinakothek der Moderne, Munich

Still Life with Geraniums is a 1910 oil on canvas painting by Henri Matisse.

The oil painting is in the collection of Pinakothek der Moderne, Munich, Germany, to whom it was given in 1912, thus becoming, according to the museum, the first Matisse to enter a public collection. Still Life with Geraniums was one of six paintings in the museum's collection to survive World War II.

This particular painting should not be confused with Matisse's earlier 1906 painting Still Life with a Geranium, which is held by the Art Institute of Chicago, or his 1912 painting Pot of Geraniums in the National Gallery of Art. (Juan Gris also painted Pot of Geraniums in 1915, sold at auction in 2007.)

== See also ==
- List of works by Henri Matisse
