= Woman on a High Stool =

Painting by Henri Matisse

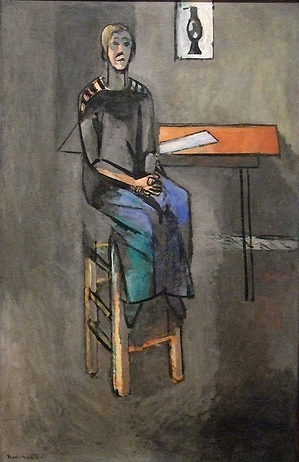
Woman on a High Stool (1914). Oil on canvas, 147 x 95.5 cm. In the collection of the MoMA, New York City

Woman on a High Stool (French: Femme au tabouret or La femme assise) is an oil painting on canvas by the French artist Henri Matisse from early 1914. It is held in the Museum of Modern Art, in New York.

It is a portrait of Germaine Raynal, the wife of the poet and art critic Maurice Raynal. With its simplified geometric structure, dark contouring, and subdued palette, the work relates closely to Paul Cézanne and Cubism.

== See also ==
- List of works by Henri Matisse
