= Landscape at Collioure =

Painting by Henri Matisse

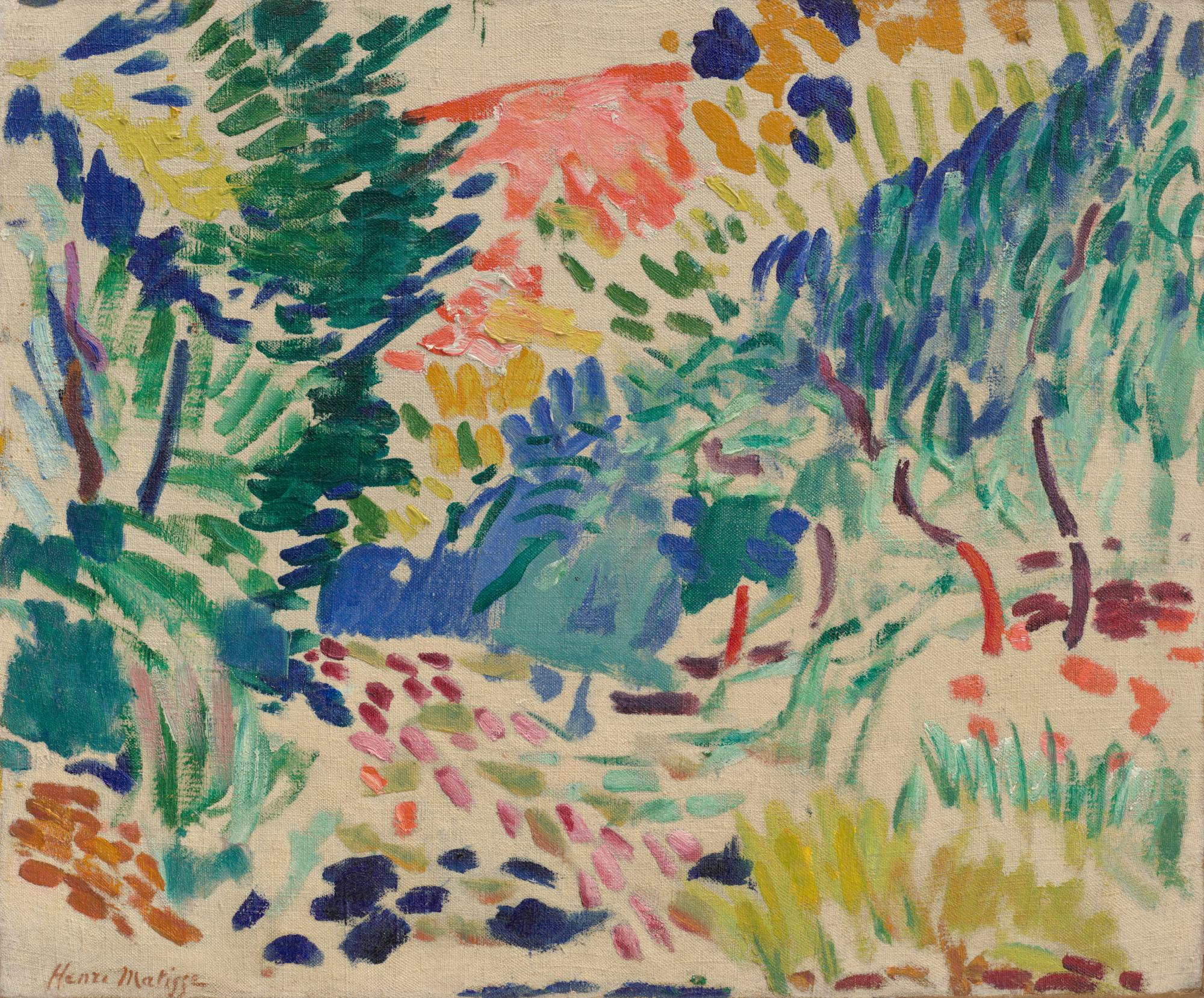
Landscape at Collioure, 1905, oil on canvas, 38.8 x 46.6 cm., Museum of Modern Art

Landscape at Collioure is an oil-on-canvas painting by French artist Henri Matisse from 1905. It is typical of his Fauvist style of the period. It is part of the collection of the Museum of Modern Art, in New York.

== See also ==
- List of works by Henri Matisse
