= View of Collioure =

Painting by Henri Matisse

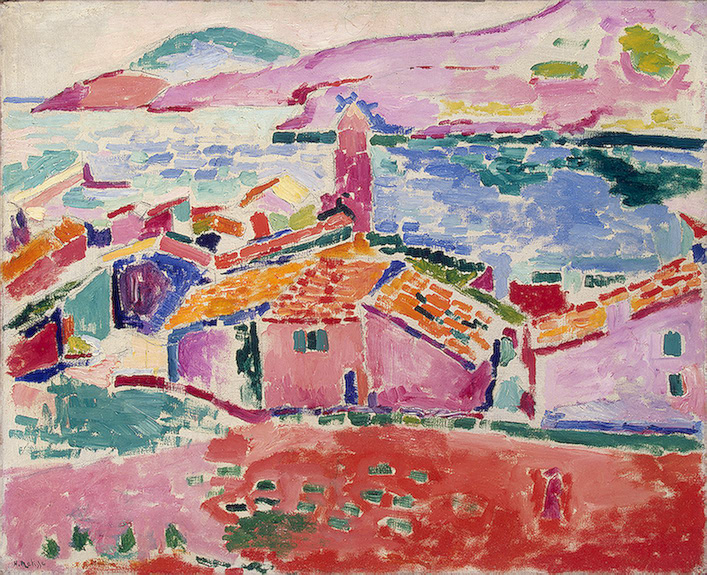
- Artist: Henri Matisse
- Year: 1905
- Medium: Oil on canvas
- Dimensions: 59.5 cm × 73 cm (23.4 in × 29 in)
- Location: Hermitage Museum; St. Petersburg

View of Collioure (French: Les toits de Collioure) is a 1905 oil-on-canvas painting by Henri Matisse. It is an example of the style that Matisse employed during his early period of Fauvism. The painting has been in the collection of The Hermitage, St. Petersburg, Russia since 1948. It was originally part of the Sergei Shchukin collection, and then was at the State Museum of New Western Art in Moscow.

== See also ==
- List of works by Henri Matisse
