= Odalisque with Raised Arms =

1923 painting by Henri Matisse

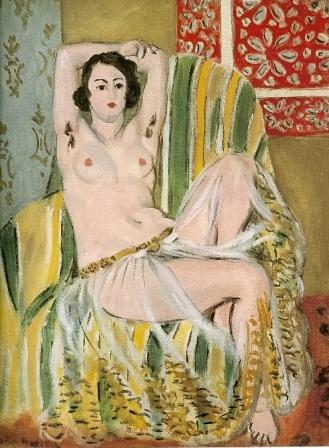
- Artist: Henri Matisse
- Year: 1923
- Medium: Oil on canvas
- Dimensions: 65.1 cm × 50.2 cm (25.6 in × 19.8 in)
- Location: National Gallery of Art, Washington, D.C.
- Accession: 1963.10.167

Odalisque With Raised Arms is a painting by Henri Matisse, completed in 1923. The oil on canvas measuring 25⅝ by 19¾ inches (65.1 by 50.2 cm) is held in the National Gallery of Art, in Washington D.C. Matisse's style changed and evolved drastically throughout his career, including his wide and varying collection of paintings depicting female nudes. His odalisque paintings were inspired by his trip to Morocco. Many of the female subjects in the Odalisque paintings were modeled after Matisse's main model at the time, Henriette Darricarrère.

== Composition ==
The subject of the painting is a woman sitting in a green and yellow striped armchair. Her figure and the chair take up the majority of the canvas. She is nude except for sheer, gold-trimmed harem pants that covers her legs and touches the floor. The woman is heavily sexualized by her suggestive pose and how Matisse portrays the curvature of her body. Her breasts are round and idealized. The brushwork in the painting is loose and shows the gestural movements of the artist.

The painting has very little spatial depth, forcing the viewer to confront the woman in the foreground. The architectural and decorative elements further focus the viewer on the seated female. The shadows and curvature of her body is accentuated in contrast with the flat rendering of patterns in the planes behind her. The red decorative element, possibly a tapestry or a painting, hanging on the wall and the striped armchair that she is sitting in offer movement to the viewer's eye.

== Matisse's sources ==
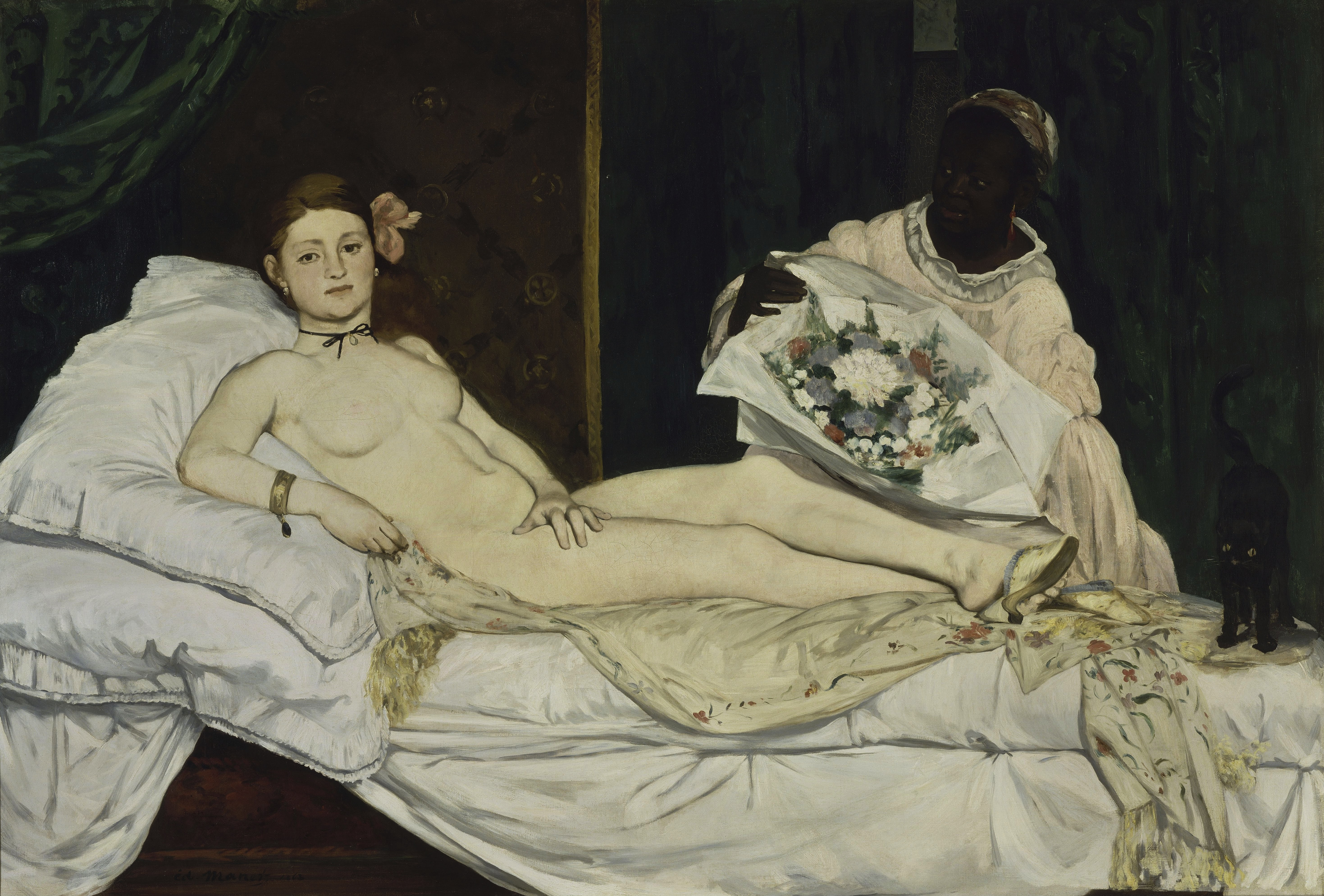

This painting is in dialogue with the tradition of the reclining female nude. The history of the depicting the nude female figure is far too vast to contrast Odalisque with Raised Arms with every painting of a nude woman. It is notable that modern painting was especially interested in straying from convention, and teachings from academic art. This slight rebellion can be seen in the manner in which Matisse paints his subject. She is only semi-reclined, her eyes are open, and though she is not engaging with the viewer by eye contact she seems to exude a level of awareness. Her attitude is reminiscent of Édouard Manet's Olympia. The gaze of the prostitute in the painting prevents easy contemplation of her body, she is guarded, she is challenging you, and she is dominating the relationship between the viewer and herself, with her as the object being viewed.

== Matisse's model ==
Matisse's model for many of his paintings including Odalisque with Raised Arms is Henriette Darricarrière. Darricarrière was born in 1901, she studied ballet, violin, piano, and painting. She sat for Matisse from 1920 to 1927.

== Morocco and the Odalisques ==
Matisse was inspired to paint his Odalisque's by his trip to Morocco in 1912, he argues for the legitimacy of the subject by stating “I do Odalisques in order to do nudes. But, how does one do a nude without being artificial? And then I do them because I know they exist. I was in Morocco, I have seen them.” The word “odalisque” is derived from the Turkish word Odalik, which means chambermaid or female harem slave. Matisse would recreate the Moorish interior that he experienced on his trip by decorating parts of his studio with his collections of “oriental” objects such as tapestries, mirrors, ornate screens, decorative wall hangings, and elaborate costumes.

== Fauvism ==
Matisse created many Odalisque paintings in the nineteen-twenties, when Henriette Darricarrière was his main model, and when he was still working loosely under the style of fauvism. Fauvism in painting is characterized by the isolation of individual brush strokes on the canvas and coloristic freedom that moves away from naturalistic representation. The repetition of the Odalisque as the subject was in a way a medium for Matisse to work through and explore his artistic purposes.

== See also ==
- List of works by Henri Matisse
