= The Open Window (Matisse) =

1905 painting by Henri Matisse

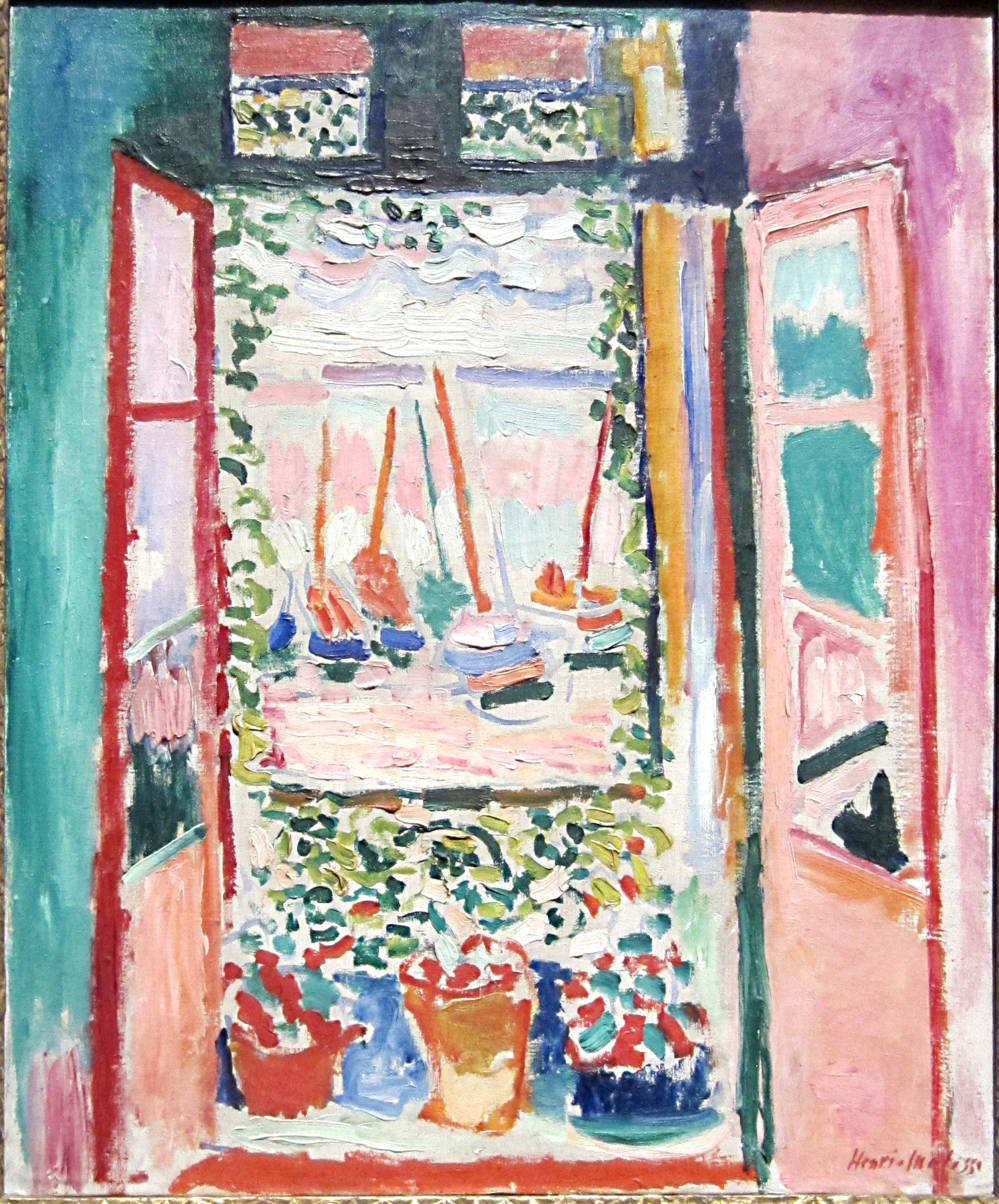
- Artist: Henri Matisse
- Year: 1905
- Medium: Oil on canvas
- Movement: Fauvism
- Dimensions: 55.3 cm × 46 cm (21 3/4 in × 18 1/8 in)
- Location: National Gallery of Art; Washington D.C.

The Open Window, also known as Open Window, Collioure, is a painting by Henri Matisse. The work, an oil on canvas, was painted in 1905 and exhibited at the Salon d'Automne in Paris the same year. It was bequeathed in 1998 by the estate of Mrs. John Hay Whitney to the National Gallery of Art, Washington, DC.

It is an example of the Fauvist style of painting that Matisse became famous for, and for which he was a leader, roughly between 1900–1909. The Open Window depicts the view out the window of his apartment in Collioure, on the Southern coast of France. We see sailboats on the water, as viewed from Matisse's hotel window overlooking the harbour. He returned frequently to the theme of the open window in Paris and especially during the years in Nice and Etretat, and in his final years, particularly during the late 1940s.

Henri Matisse loved painting open windows and painted them throughout his career.

== See also ==
- List of works by Henri Matisse
- Window at Tangier
