= Female Nude (Renoir, 1876) =

1876 painting by Auguste Renoir

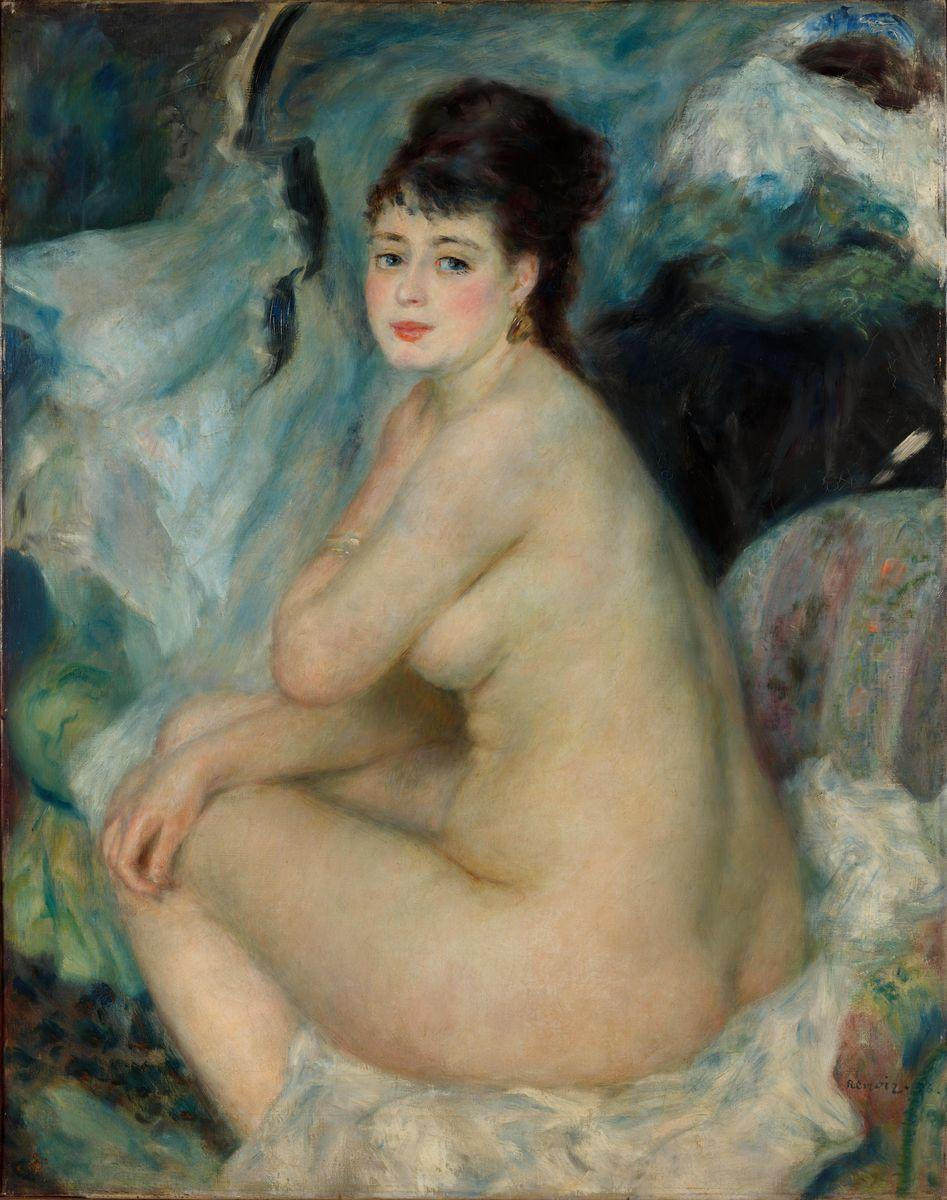
- Artist: Pierre-Auguste Renoir
- Year: 1876
- Medium: Oil on canvas
- Dimensions: 92 cm × 73 cm (36 in × 29 in)
- Location: Pushkin Museum

Female Nude is an 1876 painting by Pierre-Auguste Renoir, also known as Nude Woman Sitting on a Couch, Anna (after its model), After Bathing and Pearl. It is housed in the Pushkin Museum, in Moscow, and is an example of Renoir's many nude paintings, a recurring subject that preoccupied him throughout his life. The painting was created in the characteristic soft brush strokes of the Impressionist movement to emphasise feminine beauty.

== Background ==
Renoir's preoccupation with the human form spanned his artistic career. He painted hundreds of nudes from the 1860s until his death. The origins of this fascination can be sourced to his early years growing up close to the Louvre, where he studied the works of Peter Paul Rubens, Francois Boucher and Eugène Delacroix. He would recreate their works alongside fellow students, while preparing for his exams to enter the École des Beaux-Arts.

His interest in nudes can be seen in his earlier works, such as Boy with a Cat, which was painted in 1868 and depicts a nude boy. Renoir's nudes were heavily inspired by his interest in the Old Masters, like Rubens, but was preoccupied with depicting women as they appeared in real life, not as idealised versions of beauty. His rendering of the human torso was not without its critics, and it took some time before it was met with public approval. Despite the controversy at the time, Renoir's nudes had significant impact on other artists, such as Henri Matisse.

== Description ==
In Female Nude, Renoir depicts the ideal of feminine beauty. “La belle Anne” is the central focus of the painting, and is surrounded by cold grey-blue shades. Renoir recreates a realistic portrayal of the human body, by using small, soft brushstrokes and scumbling to make the contours of the body appear more subtle. This technique emphasises the femininity of the female body.

== Significance and legacy ==
Renoir repeatedly turned to the human body as a source of inspiration throughout his life. The body has been described as “the defining subject of Renoir’s artistic practice” and “the subject that most compellingly demonstrates how truly radical — and so often brilliant — he was”.

Renoir's obsession with the female form continues to be a source of criticism and discussion. His nudes are often faulted for being a depiction of beauty for the sake of pleasure. The subjects portrayed have been described as having a lack of engagement, which has led to suggestions that they are objectified. His nude paintings have also been described as a form of escapism.

Although his nudes remain controversial, Renoir was praised by his fellow artists, many of whom were greatly influenced by his work. Both Henri Matisse and Pablo Picasso were great admirers and bought several of his paintings. In particular, Picasso created a number of Cubist works in honour of Renoir, such as Two Reclining Nudes, painted in 1968.

== Provenance ==
Female Nude is now housed in the Pushkin Museum in Moscow, but it was in Emmanuel Chabrier's collection until 1896, when it was bought by the art dealer Paul Durand-Ruel. Two years later Durand-Ruel sold it on to the Moscow businessman Pyotr Shchukin for 15,000 francs, though its new owner dared not exhibit it in his gallery and so kept it in his bedroom for fourteen years before selling it to his brother Sergei in June 1912. The Soviet state seized the work in 1918 and exhibited it in the 1st Museum of New Western Painting, then the State Museum of New Western Art and finally in its present gallery from 1948 onwards.

== See also ==
- List of paintings by Pierre-Auguste Renoir
- Marguerite Legrand
