= Bathers by a River =

1917 painting by Henri Matisse

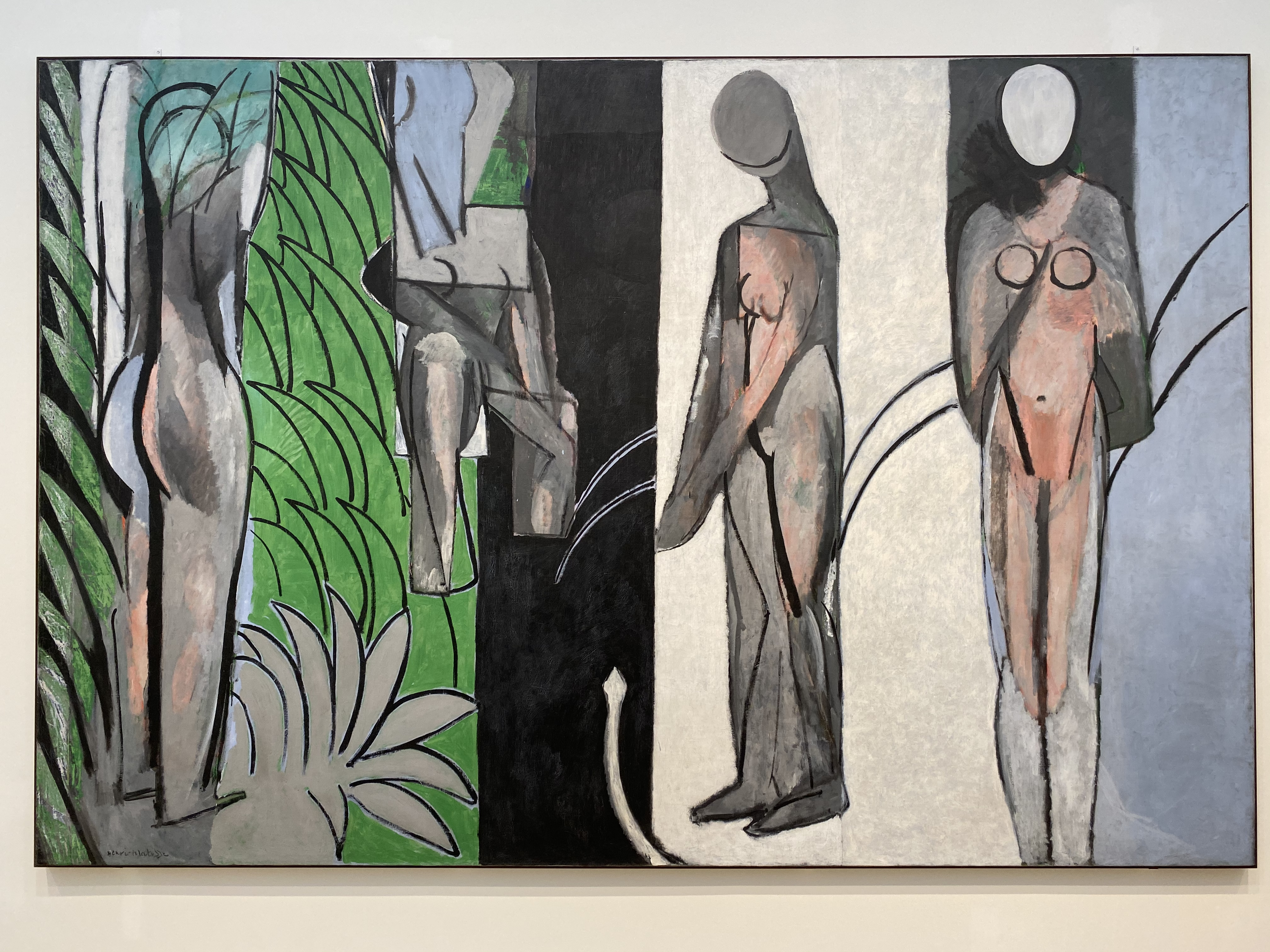
- Artist: Henri Matisse
- Year: 1916–1917
- Medium: Oil on canvas
- Movement: Fauvism
- Dimensions: 261 cm × 392 cm (103 in × 154 in)
- Location: Art Institute of Chicago; Chicago, Illinois, United States
- Owner: Paul Guillaume, 1926–1934 (his death); Jean Walter, 1934–1951; Henry Pearlman, 1951–1953; Art Institute of Chicago, 1953–present
- Website: www.artic.edu/artworks/79307/bathers-by-a-river

Bathers by a River (French: Les Demoiselles à la rivière), also known as Bathers at the River and occasionally referred to as simply Bathers, is a large 1917 oil-on-canvas painting by French artist Henri Matisse. Matisse began painting the canvas in 1909 and finished the painting in the fall of 1917, making it one of three pictures he painted (along with Piano Lesson and The Moroccans) during the Battle of Verdun.

== Background ==
Bathers by a River was originally commissioned by Russian art collector Sergei Shchukin, but Shchukin rejected it after seeing an early watercolor study of the picture. The initial concept for the painting was "a scene of Arcandian leisure" and work began on the canvas in 1909. Matisse worked on it during portions of 1910, 1913, and 1916 before finishing it in 1917. Stephanie D’Alessandro, curator of modern art at the Art Institute of Chicago, as said that there exists, "good anecdotal history that this picture was related to the two others, Dance II and Music, that were part of the original Shchukin commission."

The canvas has been extensively studied—the varnish removed and it has been x-rayed and scanned with infrared technology. A 21st century effort by curators and scientists to colorize a black-and-white photograph of Bathers by a River taken in November 1913 revealed that a portion of the colors on the finished canvas as it exists today was present in 1913. It was during the period of 1913, when Matisse was working on the picture in Morocco, that Bathers by a River departed drastically from the original idea by, "divid[ing] the canvas vertically into equal, hard-edges of green, black, white, and pale gray, suppress[ing] the waterfall, condens[ing] the foliage and transform[ing] his four bathers, cutting off the head of one, slicing another’s legs at the ankles into massive, mutilated, stone-grey figures." Nature described the evolution of the canvas as, "[beginning] as a pastoral scene depicting five nude women beside a waterfall. Matisse later removed one of the figures and transformed the others into sombre, abstract forms, isolating each one against columns of green, black, white and grey-blue, and turning a blue stream into a black band. To show how Matisse altered the painting over time, conservators at the institute combined various digital images of the work produced from infrared reflectograms, scanned X-radiographs and early photographs."

== Description ==
The Los Angeles Times remarked on Bathers by a River as the centerpiece of the "Radical Invention" exhibit in 2010:

"Perhaps most remarkably, a huge canvas poses four monumental nudes by a river. The four stone-colored, monolithic figures might also be a single woman, seen from different sides. Statuesque, they're like prehistoric goddesses in a landscape at once lush and forbidding. And if that narrow, pointed white shape rising from the bottom edge of the 12-foot-wide canvas is indeed a serpent, are these "Bathers by a River" meant to conjure up an archaic Eve?"

The picture has been compared to Paul Cézanne's Large Bathers, which was completed in 1905 and exhibited together with Bathers by a River at the Philadelphia Museum of Art in 2012.

== Interpretation ==
The Art Institute of Chicago, where Bathers by a River is on display in the permanent collection, indicates that World War I may have influenced the painting's final form:

"The sobriety and hint of danger in Bathers by a River may in part reflect the artist’s concerns during the terrible, war-torn period during which he completed it."

NPR said of the picture:

"In it, Matisse takes a traditional pastoral scene and makes it more ancient and more modern, balancing tension and peace, figure and emptiness in an image of four nudes at a river."

In another description of 2010's "Radical Invention" exhibit, NPR said, "The climax of the show includes two of his most extraordinary paintings, both combining an extreme of abstraction with readable figurative images. Both are huge, but one of them is monumental and hieratic, and the other is achingly poignant. One is the 8-foot by 12-foot Bathers by a River, from the Art Institute of Chicago, where this show originated. Matisse reworked this painting over the entire period covered by the exhibition, changing it from a lightweight pastel-colored beach scene to an exotic Eden, a gigantic icon with four female demigoddesses outlined against a row of broad flat vertical panels, with a sinister—or is it benign?—white snake rearing up its head from the bottom of the canvas. We feel something intensely symbolic, but Matisse doesn't feel the need to explain the iconography."

== History ==
The Art Institute of Chicago acquired the painting in 1953, the year before Matisse's death.

== Reception and influence ==
Bathers by a River is considered to be one of the high points of Matisse's career. It has served as the inspiration for several subsequent paintings by various artists including River Bathers (1953) by Grace Hartigan and The Bather (1983) by Sean Scully. Abstract sculptor Anthony Caro has also cited Bathers by a River as inspiration for his work. The Chicago Tribune wrote that the picture is an, "aesthetically muted, visually rigid work of early 20th century experimentation." The New York Times said of Bathers by a River, "With its immense dolmen-tree-trunk figures in shades of gray, blue and pink, it remains one of the most difficult, least ingratiating of modernist masterpieces."

== In popular culture ==
The painting was featured in the 1980 BBC television series 100 Great Paintings, and Bathers by a River plays a prominent role in the 1986 film, Ferris Bueller's Day Off, written and directed by John Hughes and starring Matthew Broderick.

== Exhibition history ==
Bathers by a River has been included in various exhibitions since 1926 including:

- New York, Museum of Modern Art, Henri Matisse: A Retrospective, Sept. 24, 1992–Jan. 19, 1993
- Art Institute of Chicago, Matisse: Radical Invention, 1913–1917, Mar. 20–June 20, 2010
- Philadelphia Museum of Art, Gauguin, Cézanne, Matisse: Visions of Arcadia, June 20–Sept. 3, 2012

== See also ==
- Fauvism
- List of works by Henri Matisse
