= Ivan Shchukin =

Ivan Shchukin may refer to:

- Ivan Shchukin (merchant) (1818–1890)
- Ivan Shchukin (writer) (1869–1908)
- Ivan Shchukin (soldier) (1909–1985)
