= Landscape, Horse on the Road =

Painting by Paul Gauguin

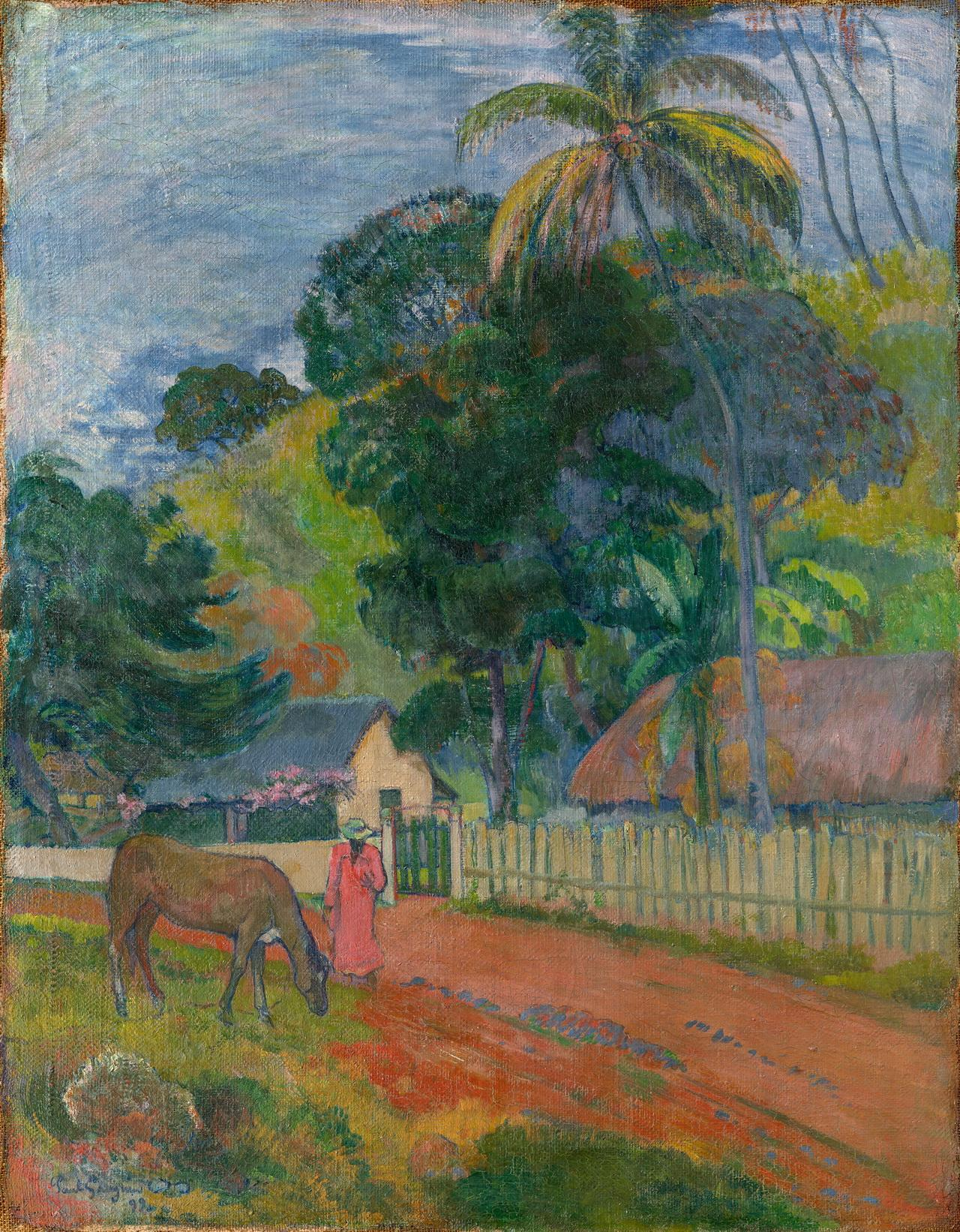
- Artist: Paul Gauguin
- Year: 1899
- Medium: oil on canvas
- Dimensions: 94 cm × 73 cm (37 in × 29 in)
- Location: Pushkin Museum, Moscow

Landscape, Horse on the Road is an 1899 oil on canvas painting by Paul Gauguin, now in the Pushkin Museum in Moscow.

== History ==
Painted in Tahiti, the work was not immediately sent to Europe, going instead with the artist's luggage from Tahiti to the Marquesas Islands. In 1903, from Hiva Oa in the Marquesas archipelago, Gauguin sent it to his dealer Ambroise Vollard Paris, making this work and nine others the last shipment he sent to France before his death.

It was bought from Vollard on 10 November 1904 by Sergei Shchukin under the title Landscape. Shchukin's collection was seized by the state after the November Revolution and assigned to the State Museum of Modern Western Art from 1923 to 1948 then to its present home.
