= Pipe Smoker Leaning on a Table =

Painting by Paul Cézanne

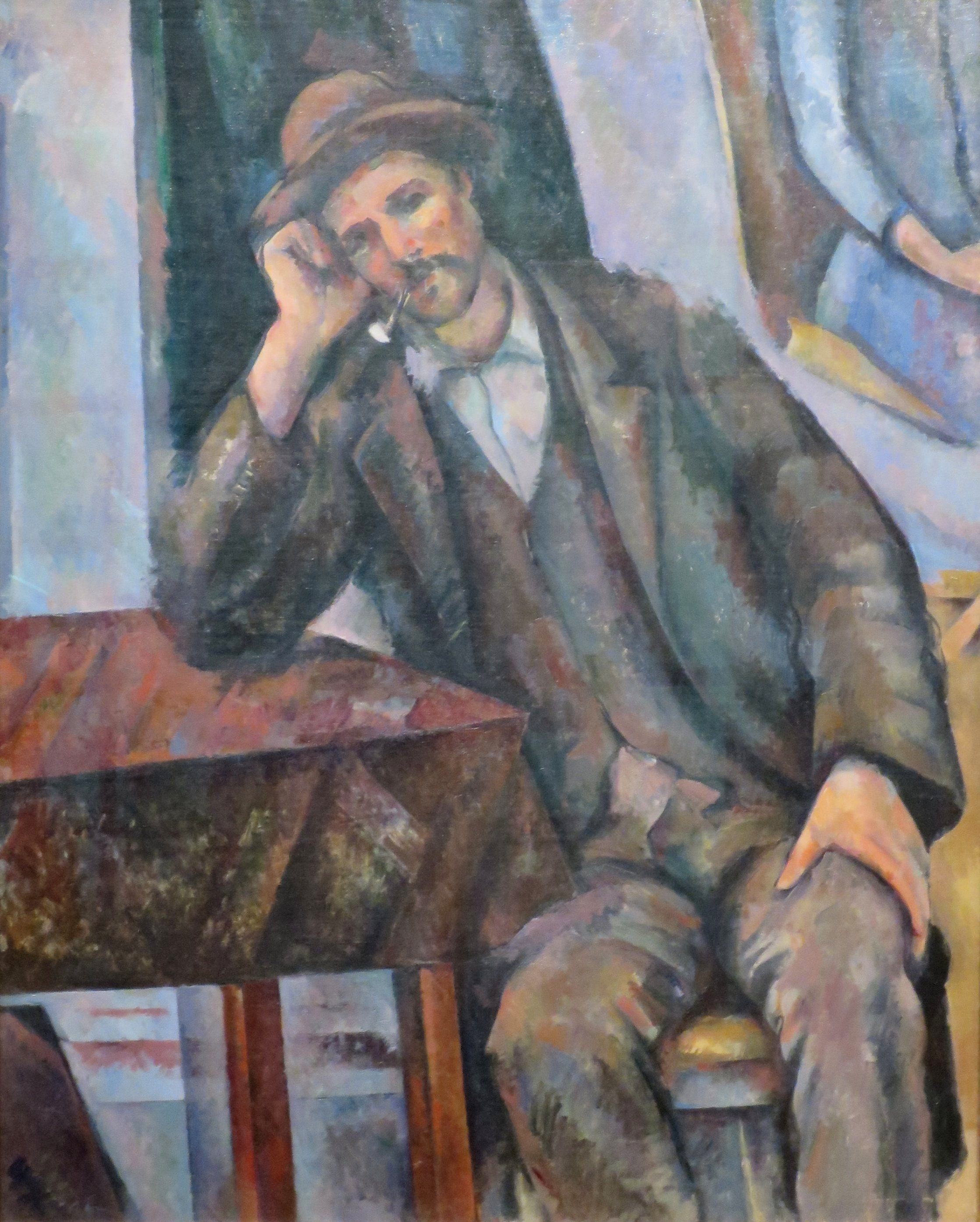
- Artist: Paul Cézanne
- Year: 1895-1900
- Medium: oil on canvas
- Dimensions: 91 cm × 72 cm (36 in × 28 in)
- Location: Pushkin Museum, Moscow

Pipe Smoker Leaning on a Table (French: Le Fumeur de pipe accoudé) is an oil on canvas painting by the French Post-Impressionist painter Paul Cézanne, created in 1895–1900. It is held in the Pushkin Museum, in Moscow.

== History and description ==
It depicts a peasant (almost certainly Paulin Paulet) smoking a clay pipe whilst leaning on a table at the Jas-de-Bouffan, the painter's family estate. At the right, it seems that part of the same painter's work Woman with a Cafetière is visible (Musée d'Orsay). The painter returned to the theme several times, most notably with The Pipe Smoker (Hermitage Museum).

The work formed part of Sergei Shchukin's collection, having been sold to him by Ambroise Vollard in 1913. Shchukin's whole collection was seized by the Soviet state in spring 1918 and Pipe Smoker was initially assigned to the Museum of Modern Western Art in Moscow, before moving to its present home in 1948. It appeared in temporary exhibitions in Moscow in 1926 and 1955 and twice in Leningrad in 1956 (including the Cézanne exhibition). It was then exhibited at Bordeaux in 1965, Paris in winter 1965–1966 and finally in Osaka in 1970.

== See also ==
- List of paintings by Paul Cézanne

== Bibliography ==
- (in Russian) Кат. собр. С. Щукина [Catalogue of the Shchukin Collection] 1913, n° 205, pp. 46–47
- (in French) Bernard Dorival, Cézanne, Paris, éd. Tisné, coll. Prométhée, 1948, p. 61 illustr.
