= Aleksandr Yatsimirsky =

Russian historian of Romania and Moldova

Aleksandr Ivanovich Yatsimirsky
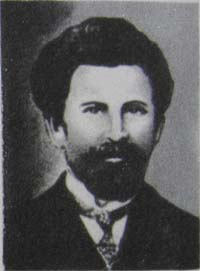
- Born: Aleksandr Ivanovich Yatsimirsky; Александр Иванович Яцимирский; 1873
- Died: 1925 (aged 51–52)
- Occupation: philologist

Aleksandr Ivanovich Yatsimirsky (Russian: Александр Иванович Яцимирский; 1873 — 1925, Leningrad) was a philologist-slavistic and a specialist in history of Romania and Moldavia. He was from the Russian Empire. He was one of the authors of the Brockhaus and Efron Encyclopedic Dictionary.

== Biography ==
Alexander Yatsimirsky was born in 1873. He graduated from Imperial Moscow University. For his study "Gregory Tsamblak" (St. Petersburg, 1904, published by the Russian Academy of Sciences) Yatsimirsky received a doctorate in Slavic philology, and in 1905 he got a positive response to the Lomonosov Prize Committee.

In 1906—1913 Yatsimirsky was Privat-docent of the Slavonic Philology Department of St. Petersburg University. From 1913 to 1918 he was a Professor of the University of Warsaw (which was in 1915 evacuated to Rostov-on-Don), since 1918 he held the post of the Rector of the Don Archaeological Institute, and since 1922 he also was a Professor of Rostov University.

Among his main works are "The inventory of old Slavonic and Russian manuscripts in the collection of Pyotr Shchukin" (Moscow, 1896 and 1897); "From Slavic manuscripts. Texts and notes. I-V"(Moscow, 1898); "Slavonic and Russian Manuscripts in Romanian Libraries" (St. Petersburg, 1905, ed., Academy of Sciences); "From the history of Slavic manuscripts of the 15th-17th centuries in Moldavia and Wallachia"(St. Petersburg, 1906); "From the history of Slavic sermons in Moldavia" (St. Petersburg, 1906); "Small texts and notes about old Slavonic and Russian literature" (St. Petersburg, 1907).

Yatsimirsky also wrote a number of articles in the Brockhaus and Efron Encyclopedic Dictionary, mainly devoted to Polish literature. Some articles of Yatsimirsky were translated to Bulgarian, Serbian, Czech and Polish languages.
