= Nave nave moe =

Painting by Paul Gauguin

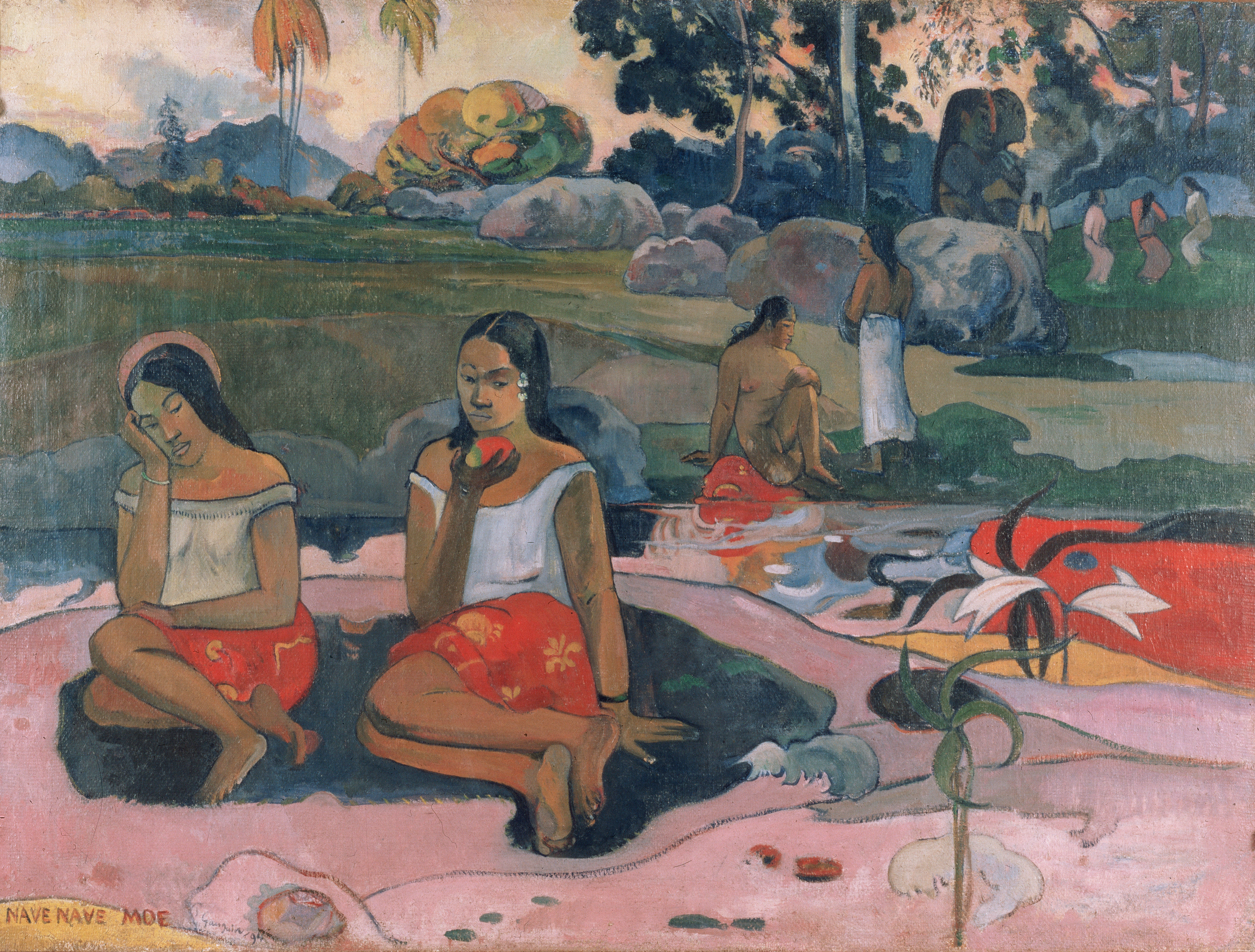
- Artist: Paul Gauguin
- Year: 1894
- Medium: oil on canvas
- Dimensions: 74 cm × 100 cm (29 in × 39 in)
- Location: Hermitage Museum, Saint Petersburg

Nave nave moe is an oil on canvas painting by Paul Gauguin, produced in Paris in 1894 but inspired by his trip to Tahiti three years earlier. It is now in the Hermitage Museum.

As early as 1895 it was displayed at an exhibition at the Hôtel Drouot, base of an auction house, under the title Eau delicieuse("Delicious water)". In 1907 it was acquired by the Moscow collector Ivan Morozov. After the Bolshevik nationalisation it was exhibited at the State Museum of Modern Western Art. It was transferred to the Hermitage Museum in 1931.
