= Marguerite Legrand =

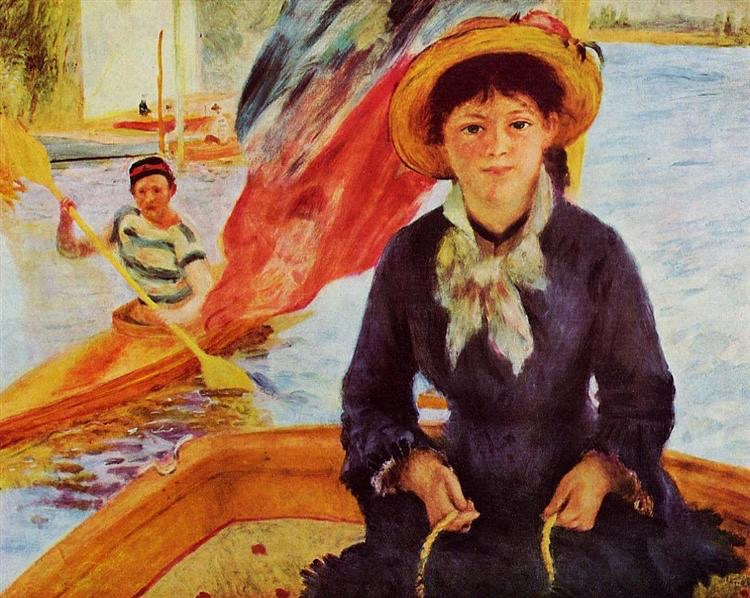
Girl in a Boat

Marguerite Legrand (January 11, 1856 – February 18, 1879) was a model and possible lover of French artist Pierre-Auguste Renoir (1841–1919). Born Alma Henriette Leboeuf in Chenoise, she went by a variety of names including Henriette-Anna Leboeuf, and most famously, "Anna" or "Margot". She was a seamstress and single parent who had one son, Georges-Jules, and lived at home with her parents in Paris at 47, rue Lafayette. Legrand modeled for Renoir for about three years. When she came down with smallpox, Renoir asked French physician Paul Gachet to treat her, but she died from the illness at the age of 23.

== Selected work as model ==
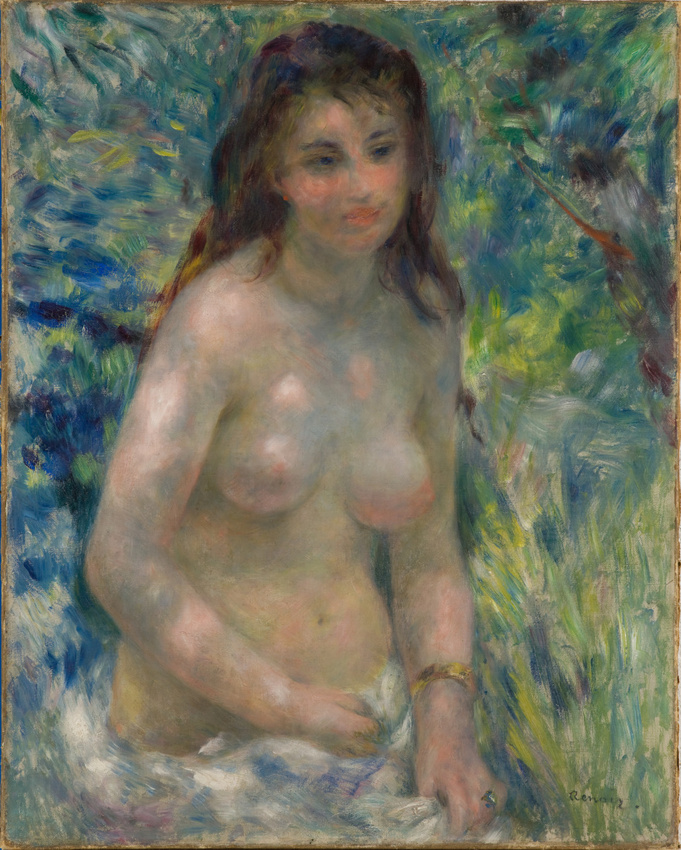
Torso: Effect of Sunlight (c. 1876)

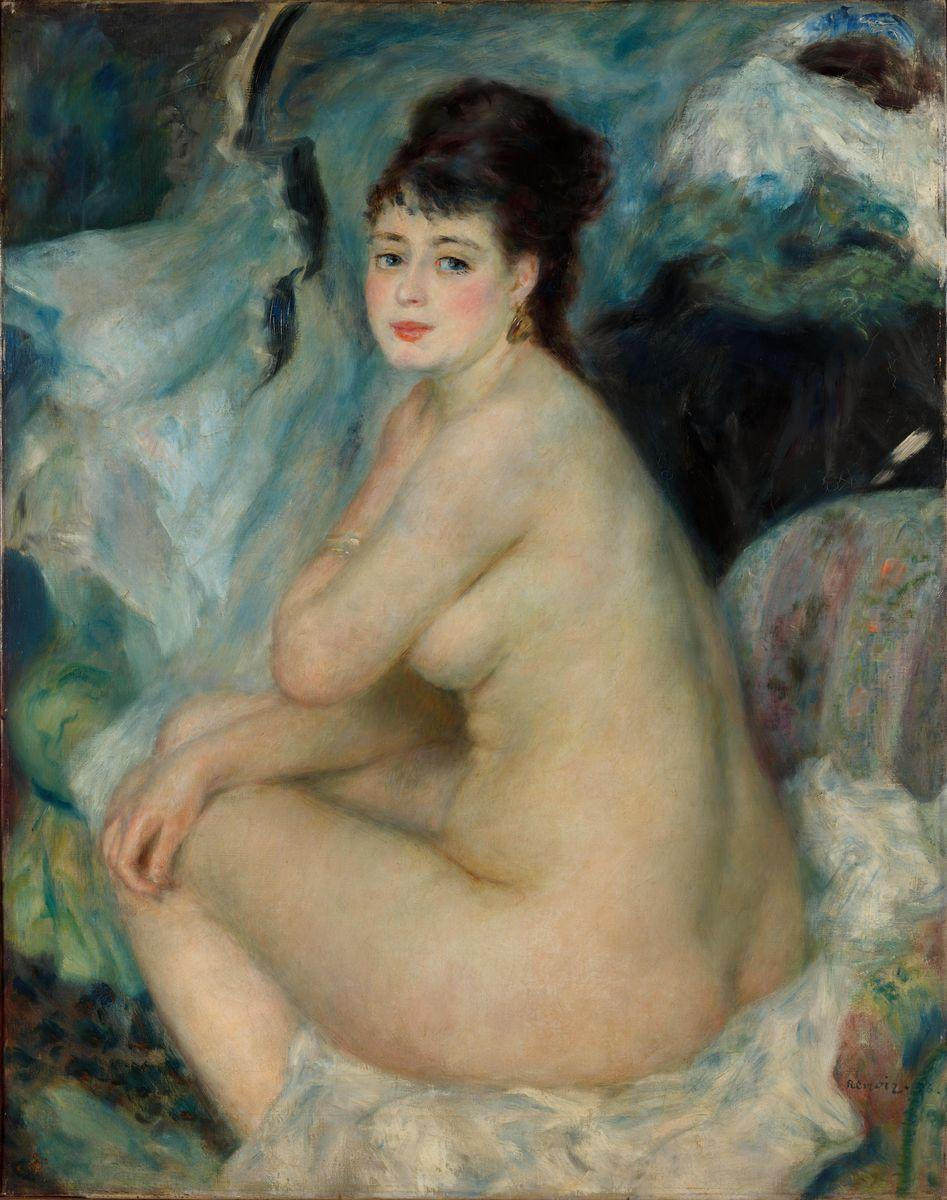
Female Nude (1876)

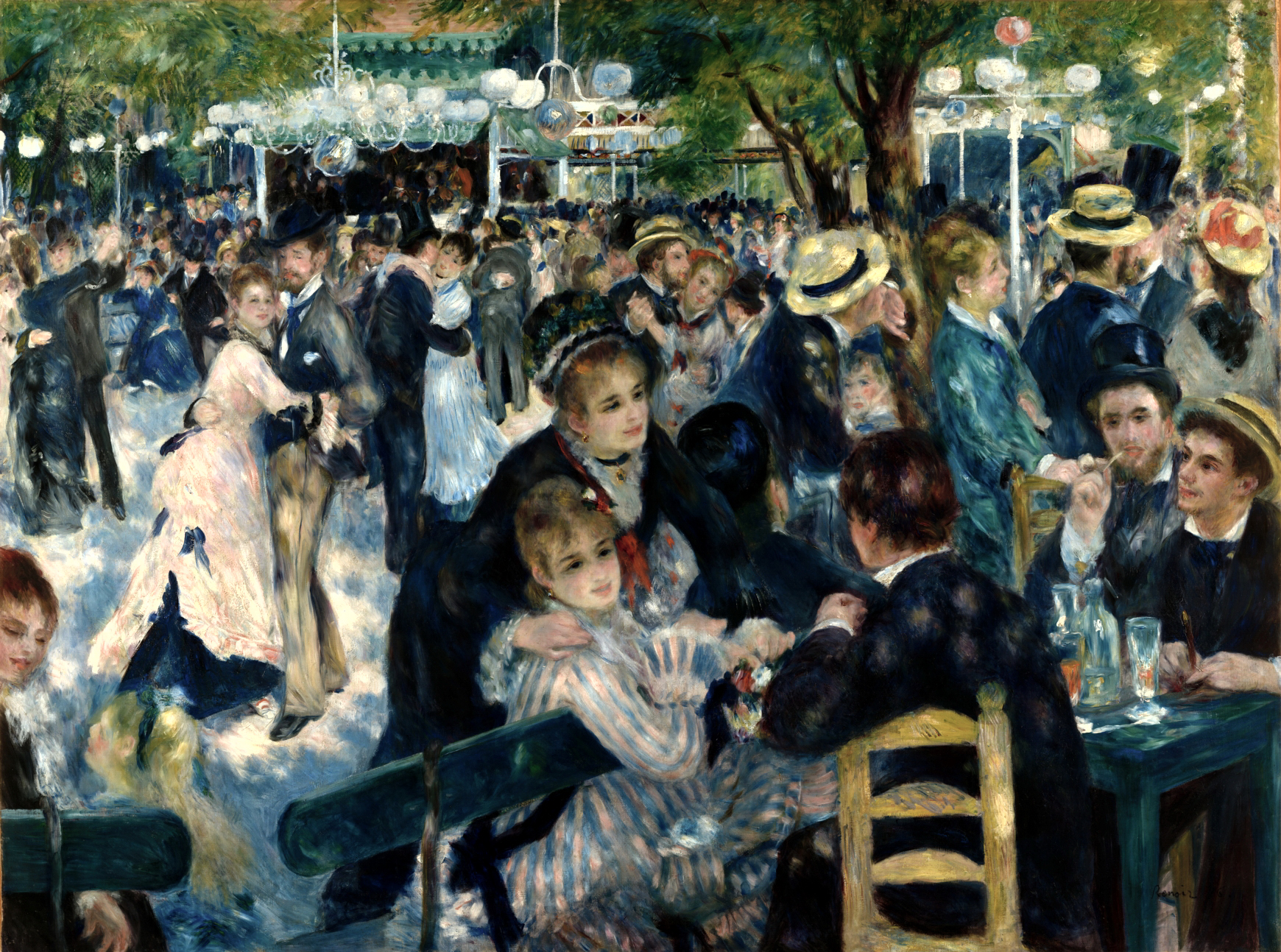
Dance at Le Moulin de la Galette (1876)

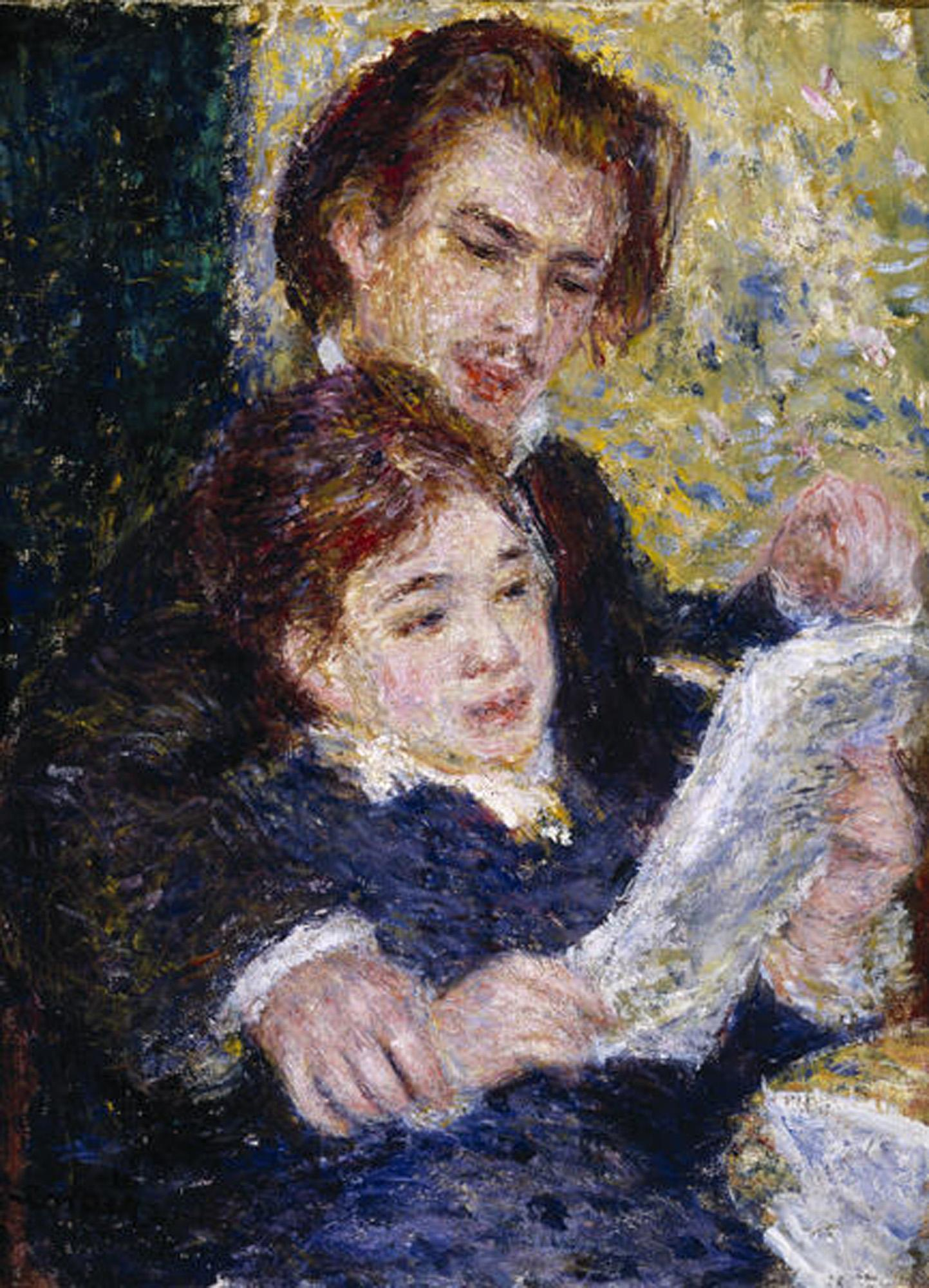
In the Studio (1876-1877)

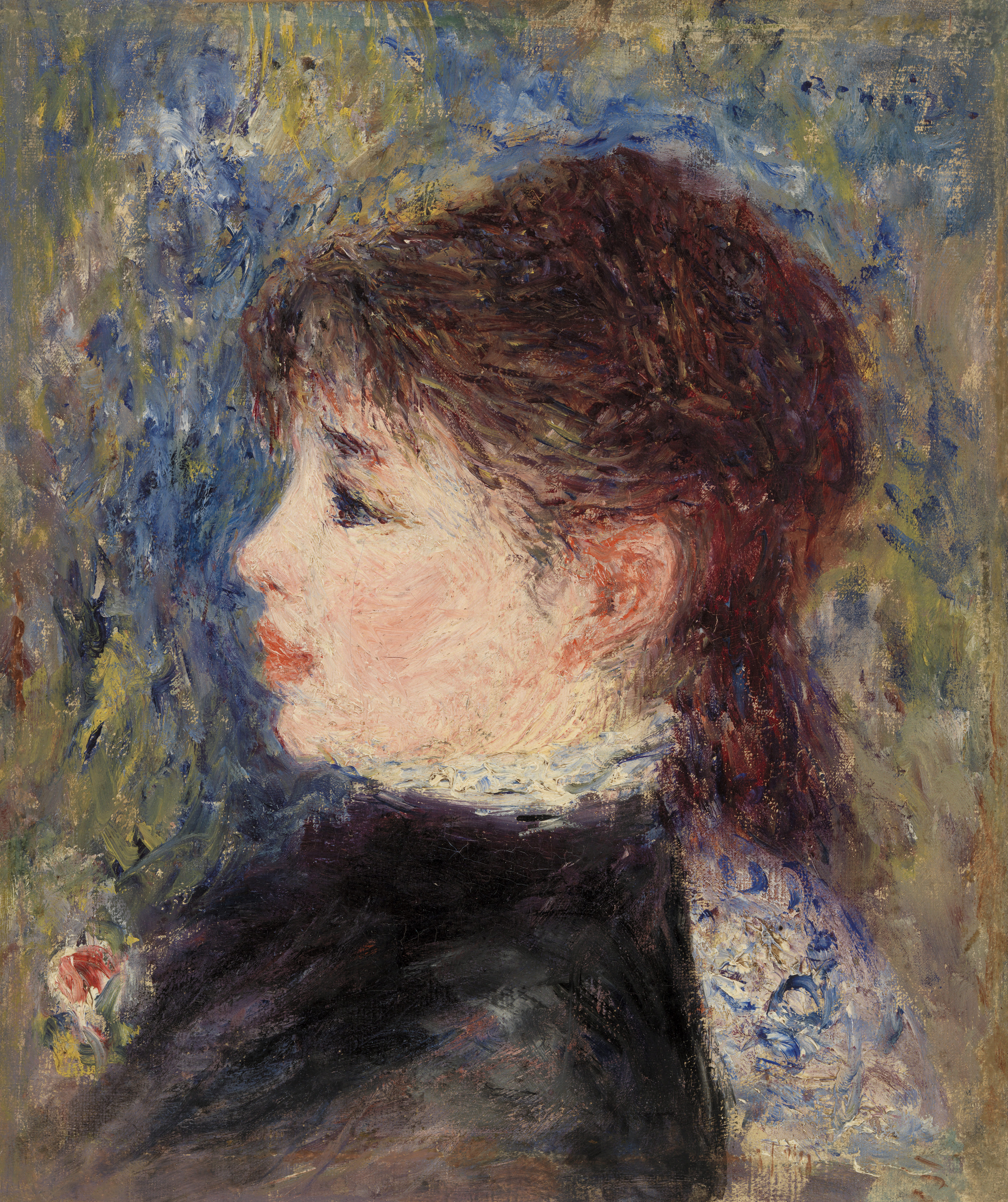
Young Woman with Rose (Jeune fille à la rose (1877)

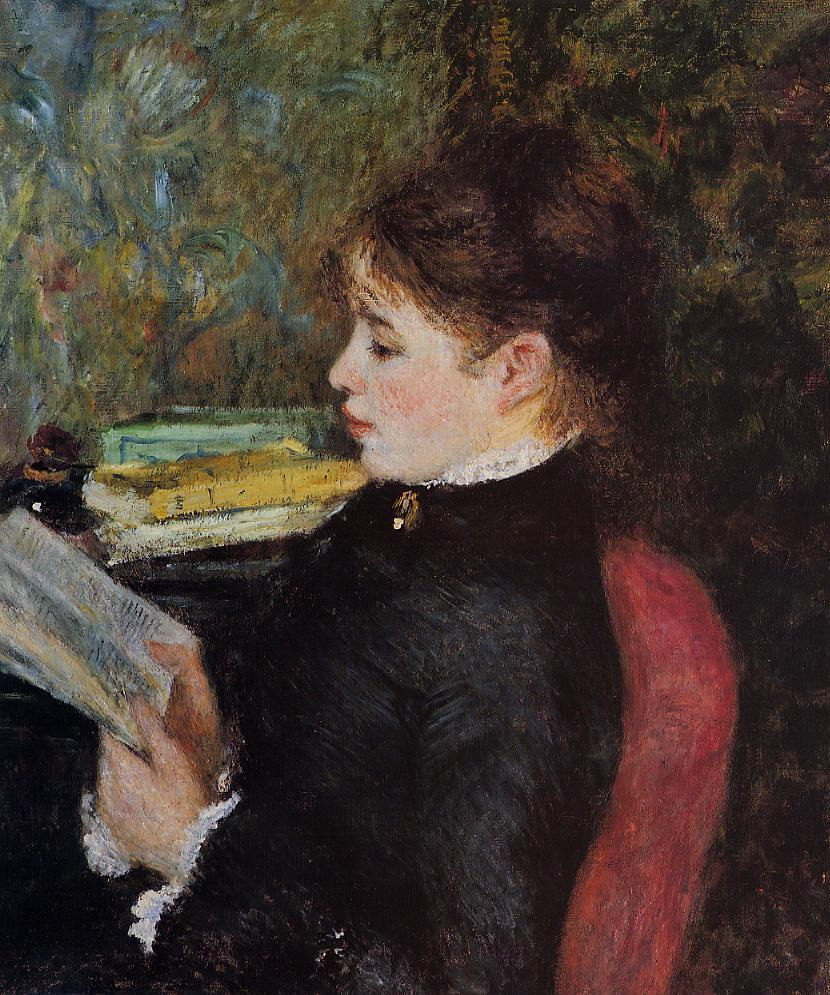
The Reader (1877)

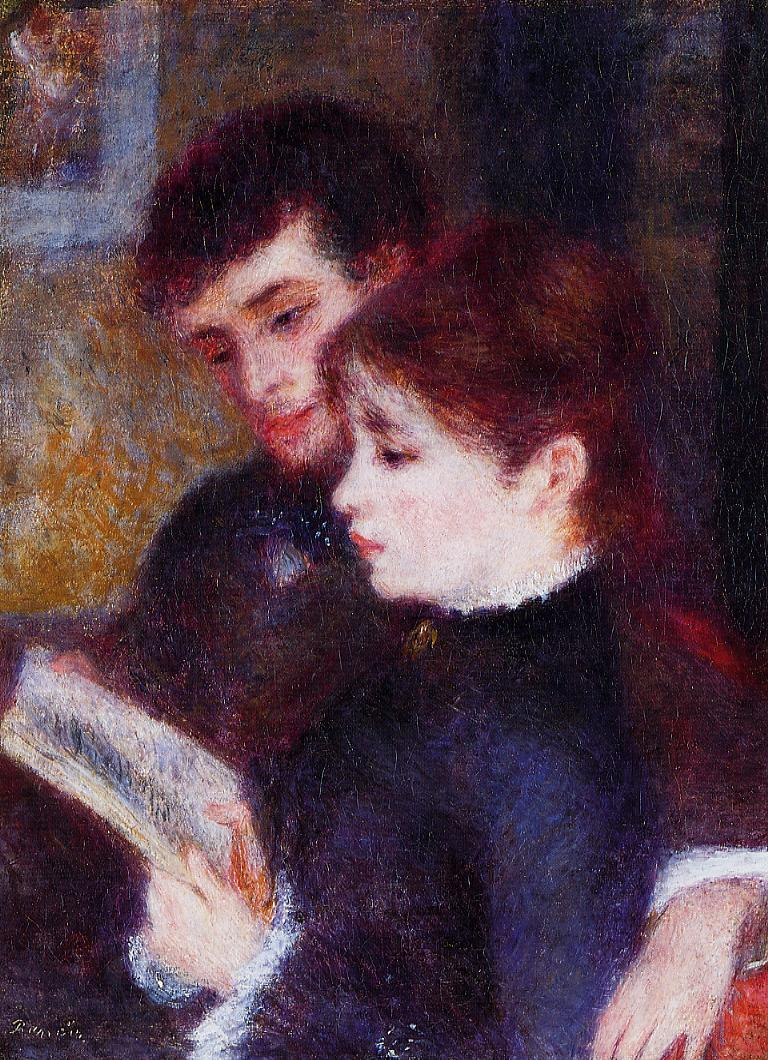
The Reading Couple (1877)

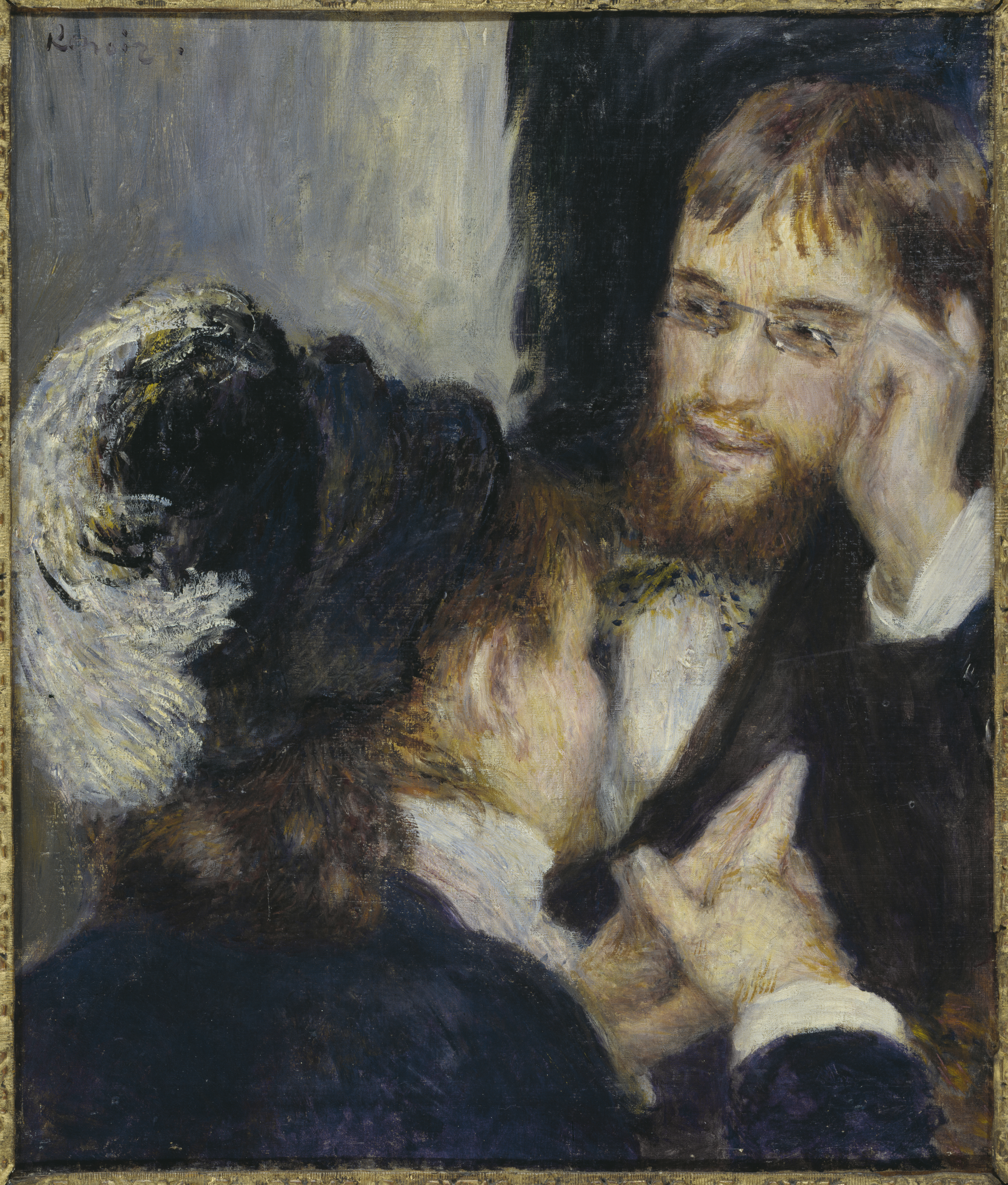
The Conversation (1878)

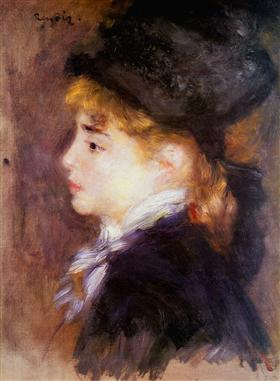
Portrait of a Model (1878)

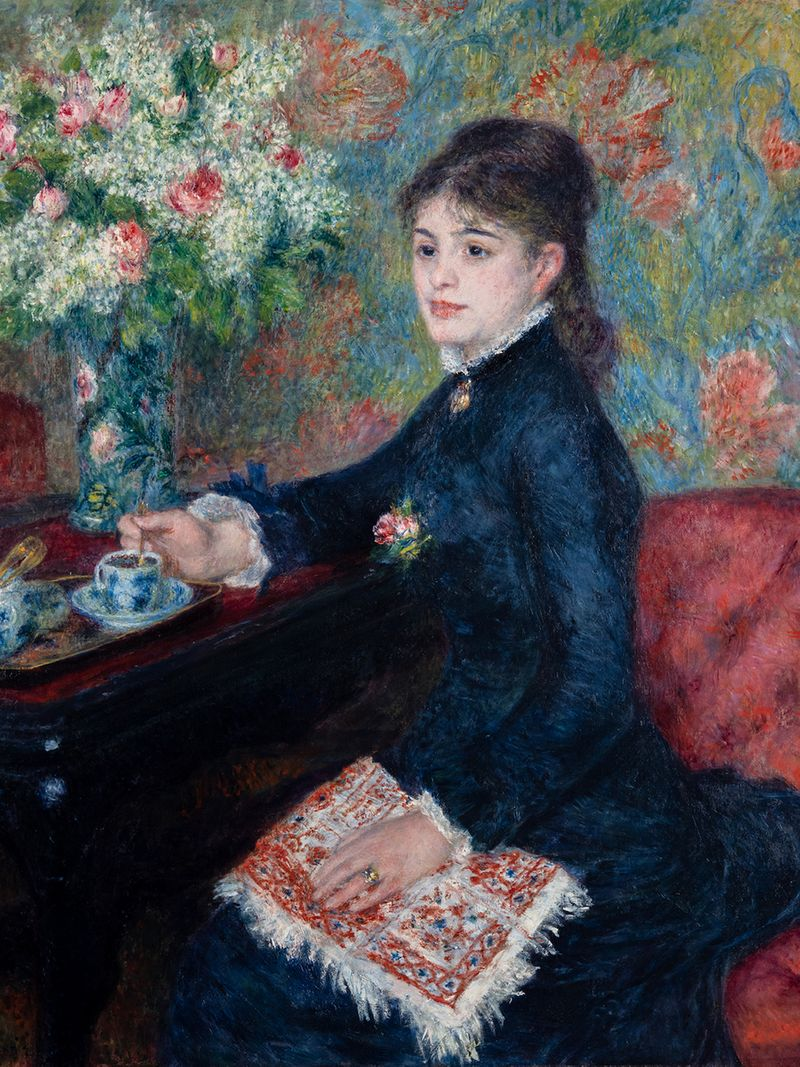
The Cup of Chocolate (1878)

== Bibliography ==
- Bailey, Colin B. (1997). Renoir's Portraits: Impressions of an Age. Yale University Press. National Gallery of Canada. ISBN 0-88884-668-1.
- Distel, Anne (1999). Cézanne to Van Gogh: The Collection of Doctor Gachet. The Metropolitan Museum of Art. ISBN 9780870999031.
- Moffett, Charles (1986). The New Painting: Impressionism 1874-1886. University of Washington Press. ISBN 0-295-96367-0.
- Strieter, Terry W. (1999). Nineteenth-century European Art: A Topical Dictionary. Greenwood Press. ISBN 9780313298981.
- White, Barbara Ehrlich (2017). Renoir: An Intimate Biography. Thames & Hudson. ISBN 9780500774038. OCLC 1012226709.
