= Music (Matisse) =

1910 painting by Henri Matisse

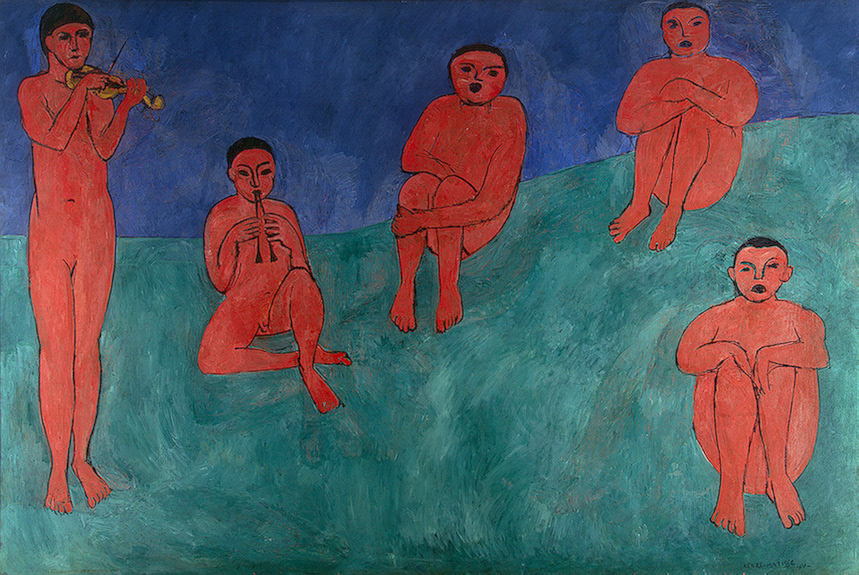
- Artist: Henri Matisse
- Year: 1910
- Medium: Oil on canvas
- Dimensions: 260 cm × 389 cm (100 in × 153 in)
- Location: The Hermitage; St. Petersburg

Music (La Musique) is a wall-size painting made by Henri Matisse in 1910. The painting was commissioned by Sergei Shchukin, who hung it alongside Matisse's 1910 Dance on the staircase of his Moscow mansion. Matisse made the painting without any preparatory sketches, and thus the painting bears many traces of modifications. One can virtually trace the steps Matisse took to find the intended effect. As in Dance, the aim was to show man's attainment of a state of completeness by immersion in creativity.

The painting is now in the collection of the Hermitage Museum in Saint Petersburg, Russia.

== Exhibitions ==
Before being delivered to Shchukin, the paintings Dance and Music were hung in the Salon d'Automne in Paris, 1910. The reception was generally poor. However, after some doubts, Shchukin chose to keep the commission. It arrived in Moscow on December 17th, 1910. In 1911, Shchukin invited Matisse to his home to oversee the installation of the works.

Around 1917, the Soviet government confiscated the painting during the Russian Revolution. In 1930, the painting was recovered, and later exhibited in Moscow and Leningrad (now St. Peteresburg). However, it was censored by adding red paint to hide the penis on one of the flute players. Restoration was later carried out to remove the paint.

The painting is currently in Hall 440 in the Hermitage Museum in Russia.

== See also ==
- List of works by Henri Matisse
