= Ivan Shchukin (merchant) =

Moscow textile merchant

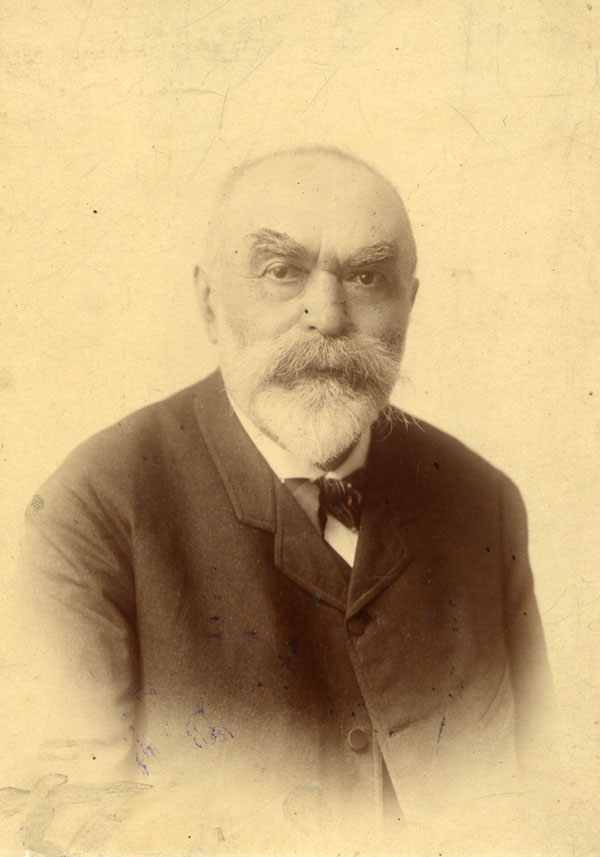
- Ivan Shchukin
- Born: Ivan Vassilievitch Shchukin; 1818
- Died: 1890 (aged 71–72)
- Occupation: Textile merchant

Ivan Vassilievitch Shchukin (1818-1890) was a Moscow merchant in the textile trade whose company, I.V. Shchukin and Sons, became one of the largest textile businesses in Russia. Several of his sons formed important art collections around the end of the nineteenth and start of the twentieth centuries.

== Early life and family ==
Ivan Vassilievitch Shchukin was born in 1818 from an Old Believer background.

He married Ekaterina, the daughter of Pyotr Konovich Botkin, a tea merchant and patron of the arts. Their ten children included Pyotr Shchukin (1853-1912) who built an important collection of Russian ancient art and artifacts and owned several impressionist masterpieces, Sergei Shchukin (1854-1936), who was also a noted art collector, Dimitri Shchukin, who assembled "Moscow's best collection of Old Masters" that eventually entered the Pushkin Museum, and Ivan Shchukin (1869-1908), who also collected art.

== Career ==
Shchukin was a self-made Moscow merchant in the textile trade whose company, I.V. Shchukin and Sons, became one of the largest textile companies in Russia and enabled him to acquire a wealth of 4 million gold rubles.

== Death and legacy ==
Shchukin died in 1890, leaving his business to his son Sergei Shchukin, which gave him the wealth necessary to form his collection of modern art.
