= Ivan Shchukin (writer) =

Paris art patron and collector (1869–1908)

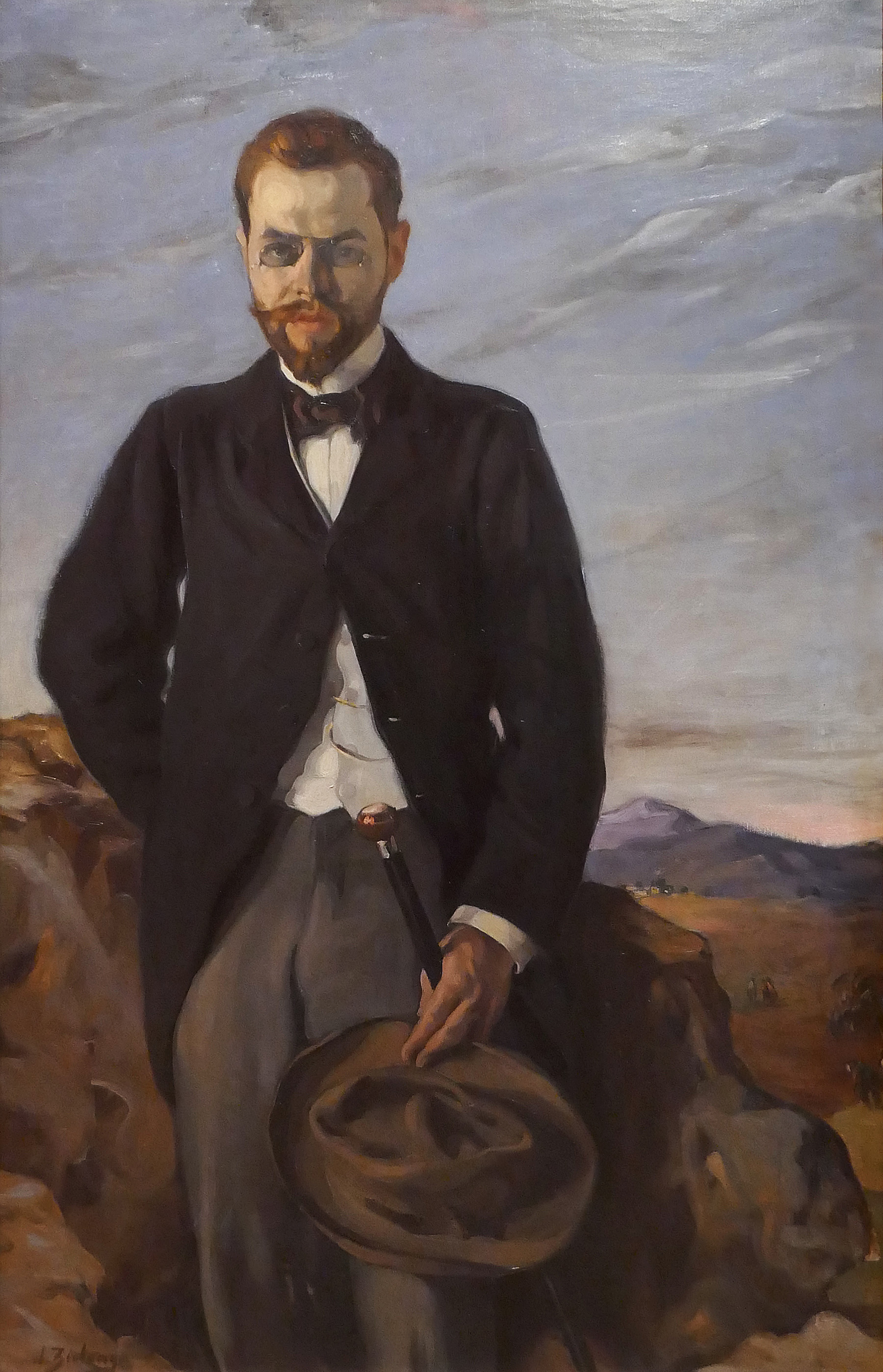
Portrait of Chtchoukine by Ignacio Zuloaga (Hermitage Museum).

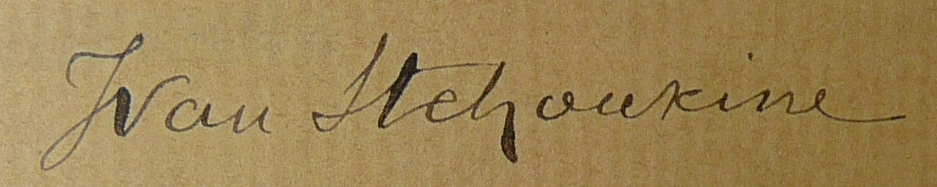
His signature

Ivan Ivanovitch Shchukin, Chtchoukine or Stchoukine ((in Russian) Иван Иванович Щукин; 23 November 1869 – 15 January 1908) was a Russian writer and patron of the arts. He was son of Ivan Shchukin (1818-1890) and a younger brother of the collectors Pyotr and Sergei Shchukin.

== Life ==
He was born in Moscow to a family of well-to-do merchants. After finishing his secondary schooling at the "Tsarevitch Nicolas" school and his legal studies at Moscow State University, he moved to Paris in 1893. There he became a Russian language tutor at the École des Langues Orientales until 1897 From 1897 to 1908 he was history professor at the 'Université nouvelle de Bruxelles (Institut des hautes études).

In 1907 he gave part of his library to the Bibliothèque des langues orientales. · He collected impressionist paintings and Spanish old masters · In his home at 91, avenue de Wagram he held a salon frequented by Auguste Rodin, Edgar Degas, Auguste Renoir, Odilon Redon, Joris-Karl Huysmans, Paul Durand-Ruel, Anton Tchékhov, Dimitri Merejkovski, Maximilian Volochine, Igor Grabar, Constantin Balmont and Alexandre Benois.

After the sale of his second collection, marked by controversies over paintings' authenticity, he died in the 17th arrondissement of Paris and as buried at cimetière du Montmartre. · His collection and library were split up in two posthumous sales. · · .

== Works ==
- Précis d'histoire du droit romain. 1893
- Biron dans la gravure d'Ivan Sokolov : une page d'histoire de l'iconographie russe (Бирон в гравюре Ив. Соколова: страничка из истории русской иконографии). Saint Petersburg, 1893
- Aquarelles parisiennes : le genre et le paysage (Парижские акварели: Жанр и пейзаж). Fasc. 1–2. Paris, 1897
- Aquarelles parisiennes : Récits et correspondances (Парижские акварели: Очерки и корреспонденции). Paris, 1901
- Le suicide collectif dans le raskol russe. Paris, 1903
