= State Museum of Modern Western Art =

Museum in Soviet Union

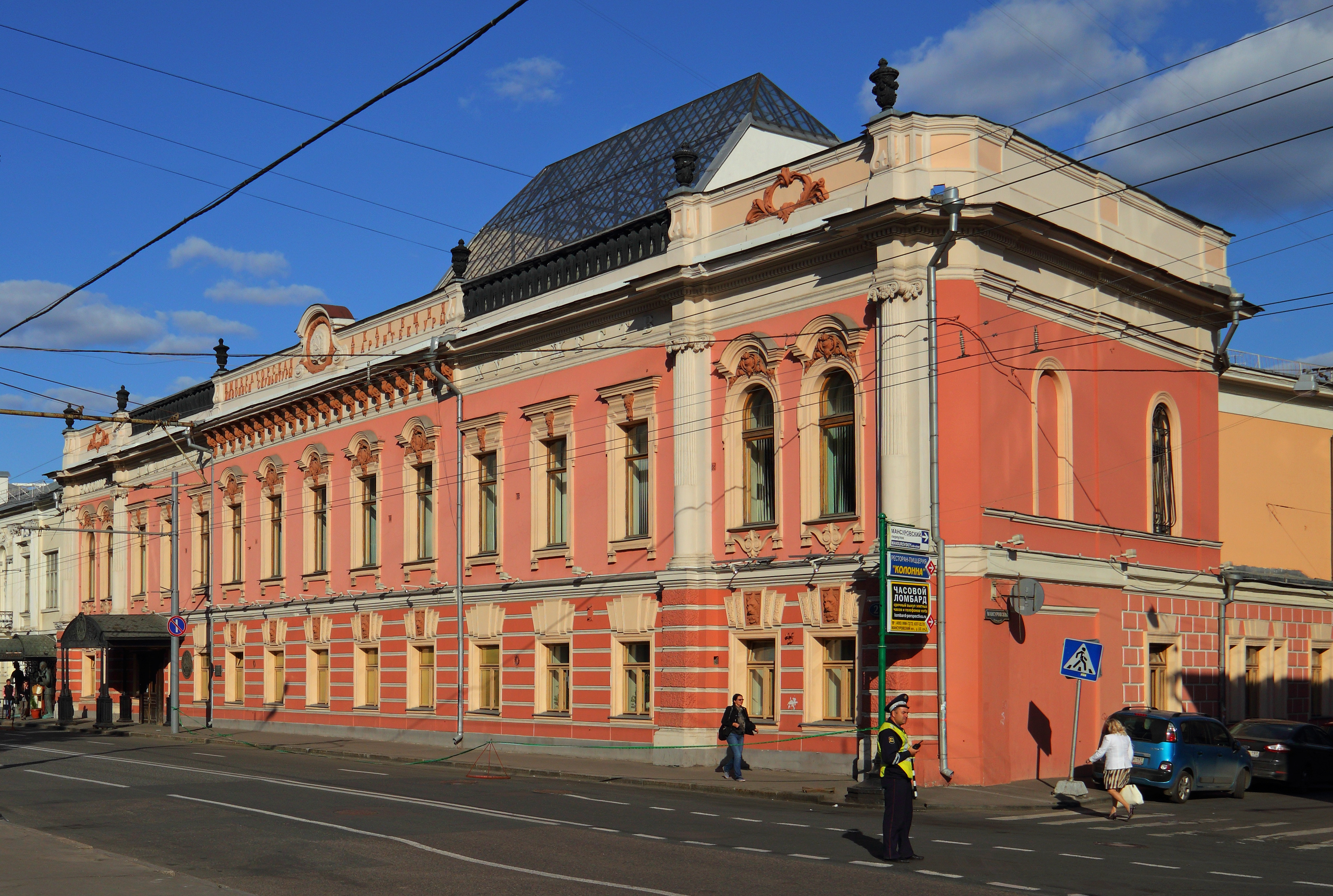
The former museum building

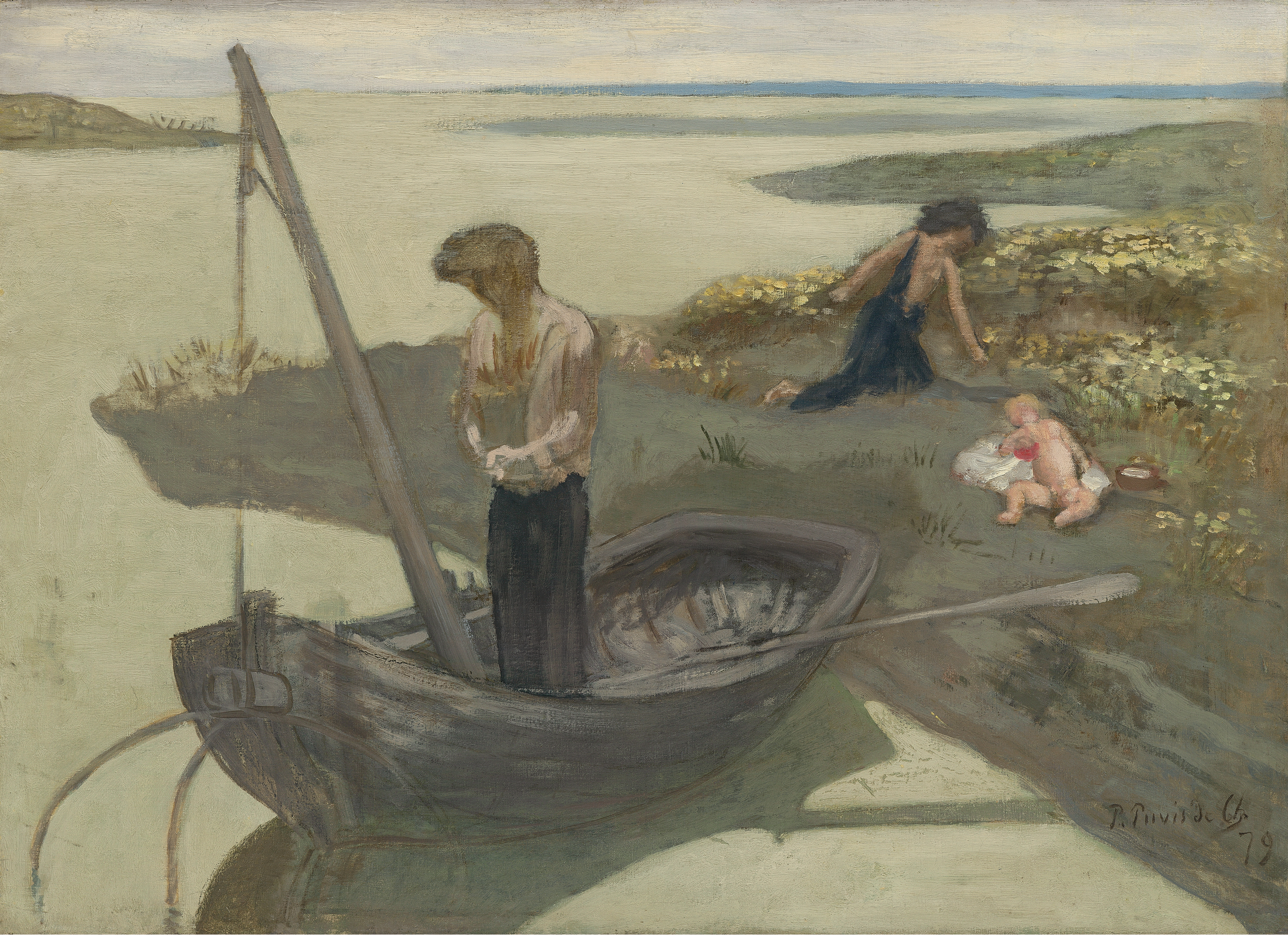
Pierre Puvis de Chavannes, The Poor Fisherman (1879 sketch)

The State Museum of Modern Western Art (Russian: Государственный музей нового западного искусства, ГМНЗИ GMNZI) was a museum in Moscow. It was based on the collection of paintings assembled by Sergei Schukin and Ivan Morozov, and nationalized by the Soviet Russia in 1918. Sergei Schukin collection was transformed into the 1st Museum of Modern Western Painting, while Ivan Morozov’s collection was made into the 2nd Museum of Modern Western Painting. In 1923, the 1st and 2nd Museums of Modern Western Painting were merged to form the State Museum of Modern Western Art.

In 1941-1944 during World War II, the collection was evacuated to Sverdlovsk.

It was shut down on 6 March 1948 by Stalin and its art pieces were split between the Hermitage Museum in St. Petersburg and the Pushkin Museum in Moscow.

Art expert Natalia Semenova noted that “because of the dread that the Moscow-based curators of the Pushkin Museum had displayed, as they feared to leave the utterly “formalist” masterpieces of Picasso, Cezanne and Matisse in the Soviet capital, right next to the walls of the Kremlin, the Hermitage ultimately received the best and largest part of the masterpieces of the Museum”.

== Liquidation of the Museum ==
The Decree No. 672 of March 6, 1948 of the Council of Ministers of the USSR “On the liquidation of the State Museum of New Western Art” read: “The Council of Ministers of the USSR believes that the State Museum of Modern Western Art in Moscow contains predominantly unprincipled, anti-popular, formalistic creations of Western European bourgeois art, devoid of any progressive educational value for the Soviet spectators. The formalistic collections of the State Museum of New Western Art, that had been purchased in Western European countries by Moscow capitalists in the late 19th and early 20th centuries, became a breeding ground for formalistic views and servility to the decadent bourgeois culture of the era of imperialism, and caused great harm to the progress of Russian and Soviet art. Displaying the museum's collection to the general audience is harmful from political standpoint and promotes the dissemination of alien bourgeois formalistic views within the Soviet art.”

== Attempts of re-creation of the Museum and its Online Version ==
The former Pushkin Museum director Irina Antonova put forward the idea of re-creation of the Museum in 2010 by reassembling parts of the Museum collections stored after 1948 at the Pushkin Museum and Hermitage Museum. She offered one of the Pushkin Museum buildings as the place where the re-created Museum of Modern Western Art could be situated. But Hermitage Museum director Mikhail Piotrovsky declined the idea of giving back even part of former Sergei Schukin and Ivan Morozov collections that had found their way to Saint Petersburg after the October revolution, and Antonova’s project became impracticable.

In 2013 Russian minister of culture Vladimir Medinsky declared that the Museum will not be re-created, but will function in the form of online version.

== Former Sergei Schukin paintings within the Museum collection ==
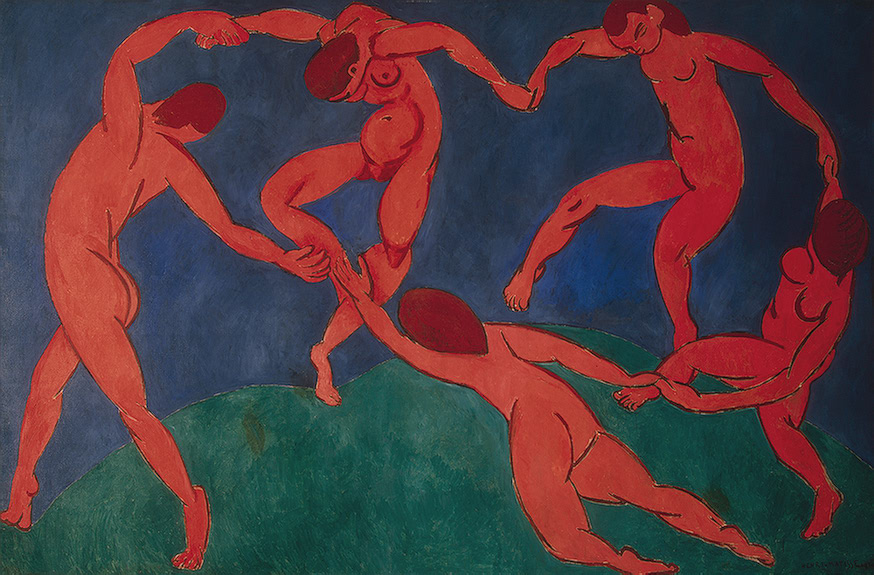
Henri Matisse, The Dance (second version), 1910, transferred to Hermitage Museum

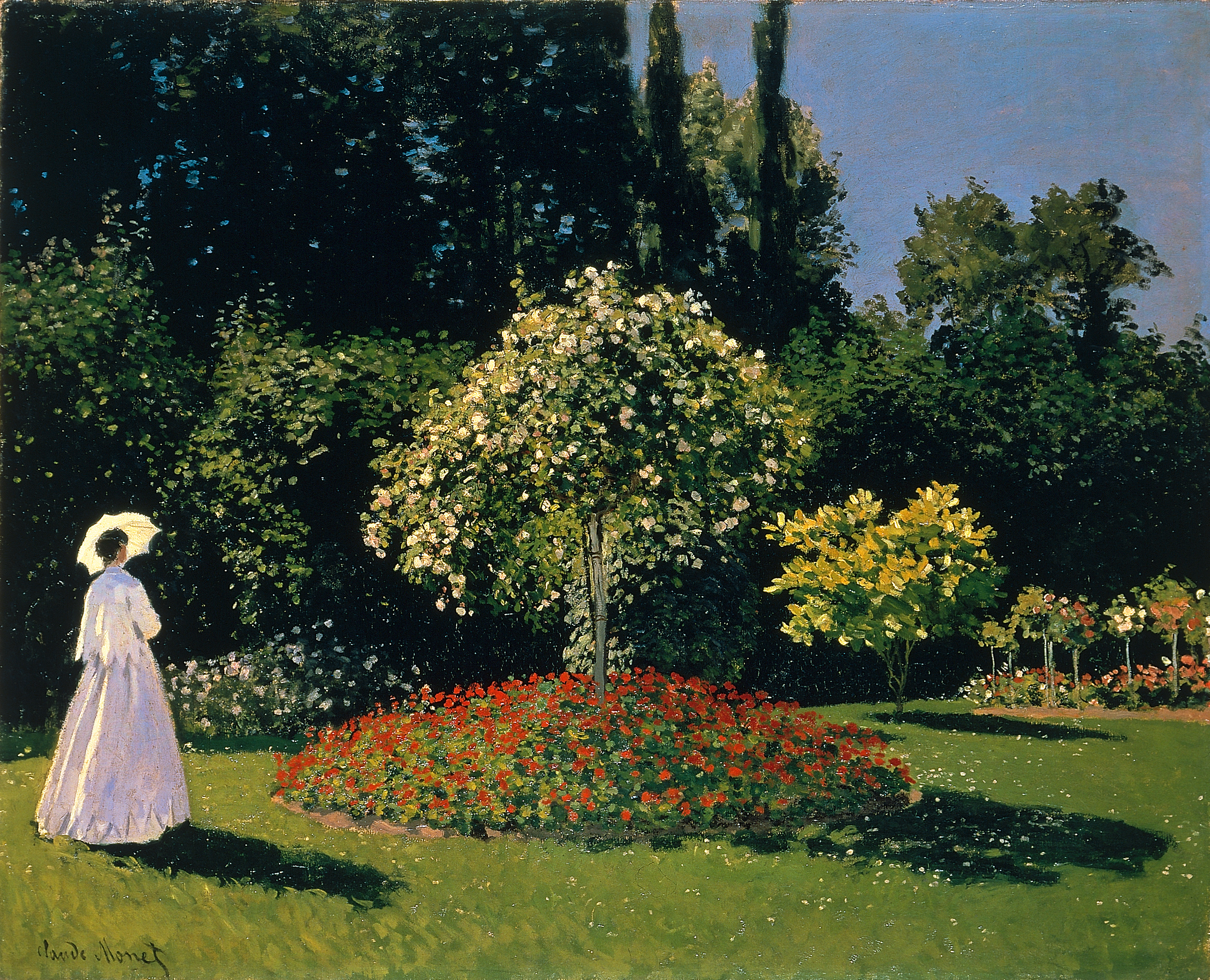
Claude Monet, Dame au jardin de Sainte-Adresse, transferred to Hermitage Museum in 1930

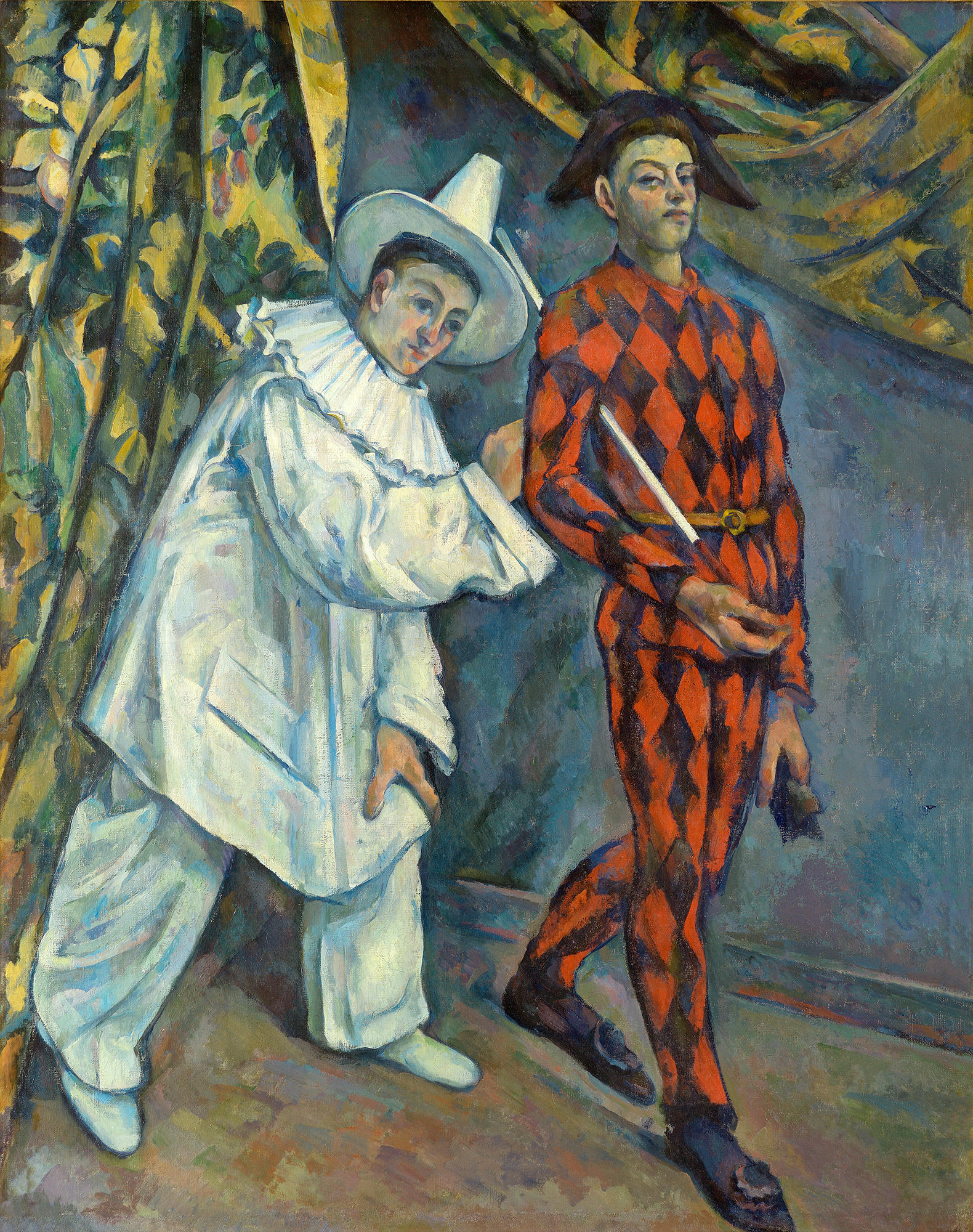
Paul Cézanne, Pierrot et Arlequin, now at Pushkin Museum

Paul Gauguin, Ah, tu es jaloux?, Pushkin Museum

Edgar Degas, Danseurs bleus, Pushkin Museum

== Former Ivan Morozov paintings within the Museum collection ==
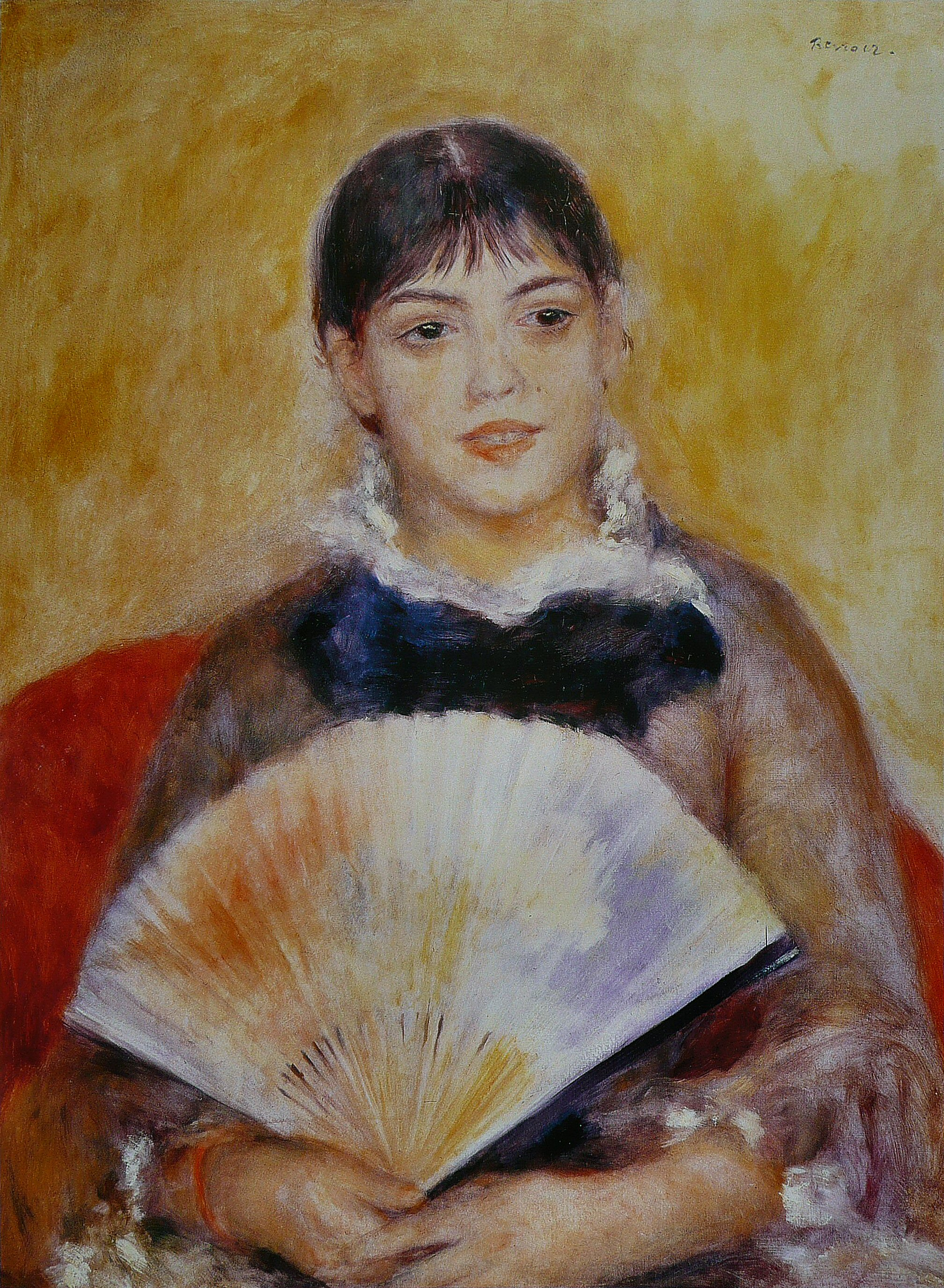
Pierre-Auguste Renoir, Fille avec un éventail, Hermitage Museum

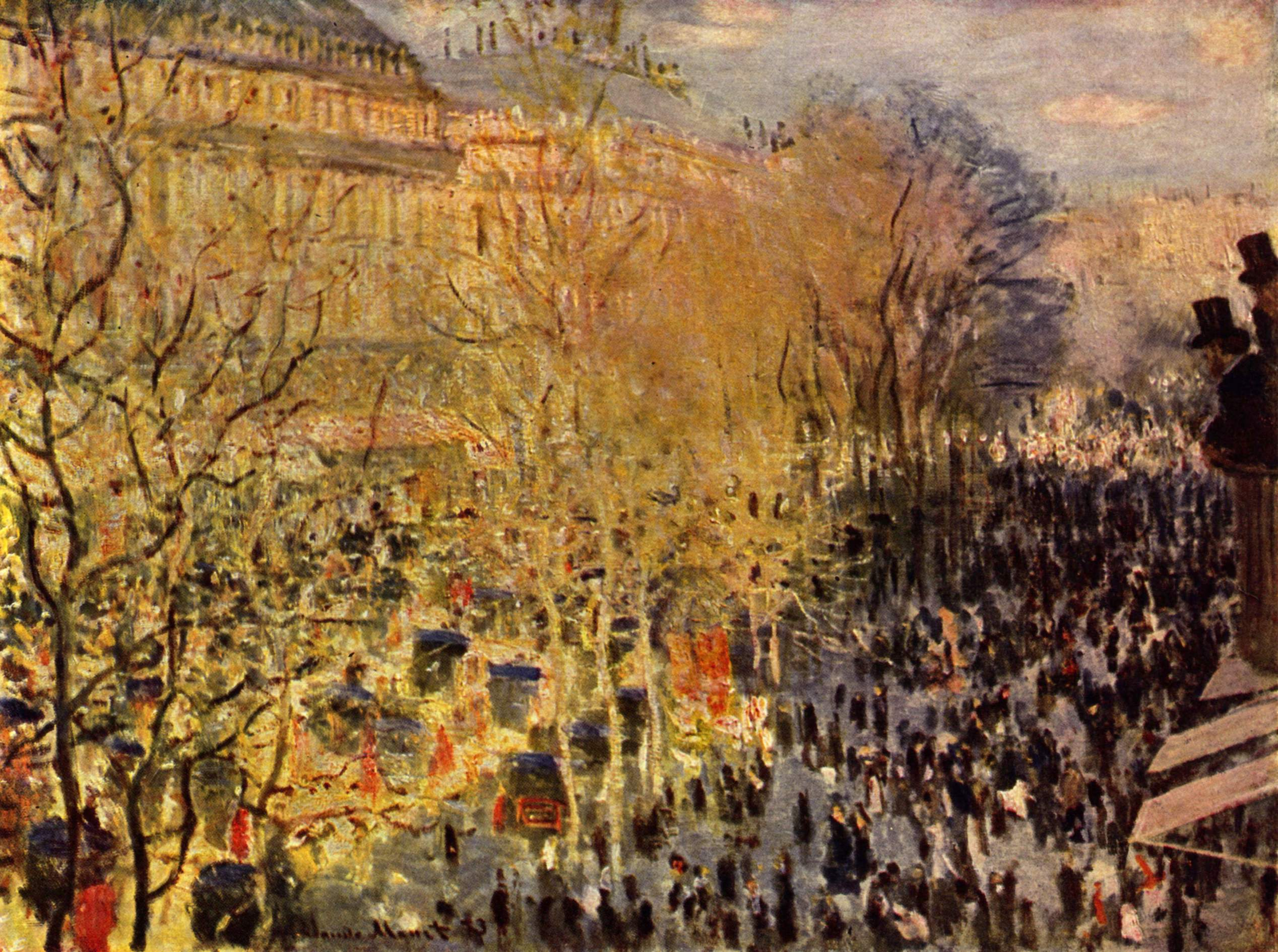
Claude Monet, Boulevard des Capucines à Paris, Pushkin Museum

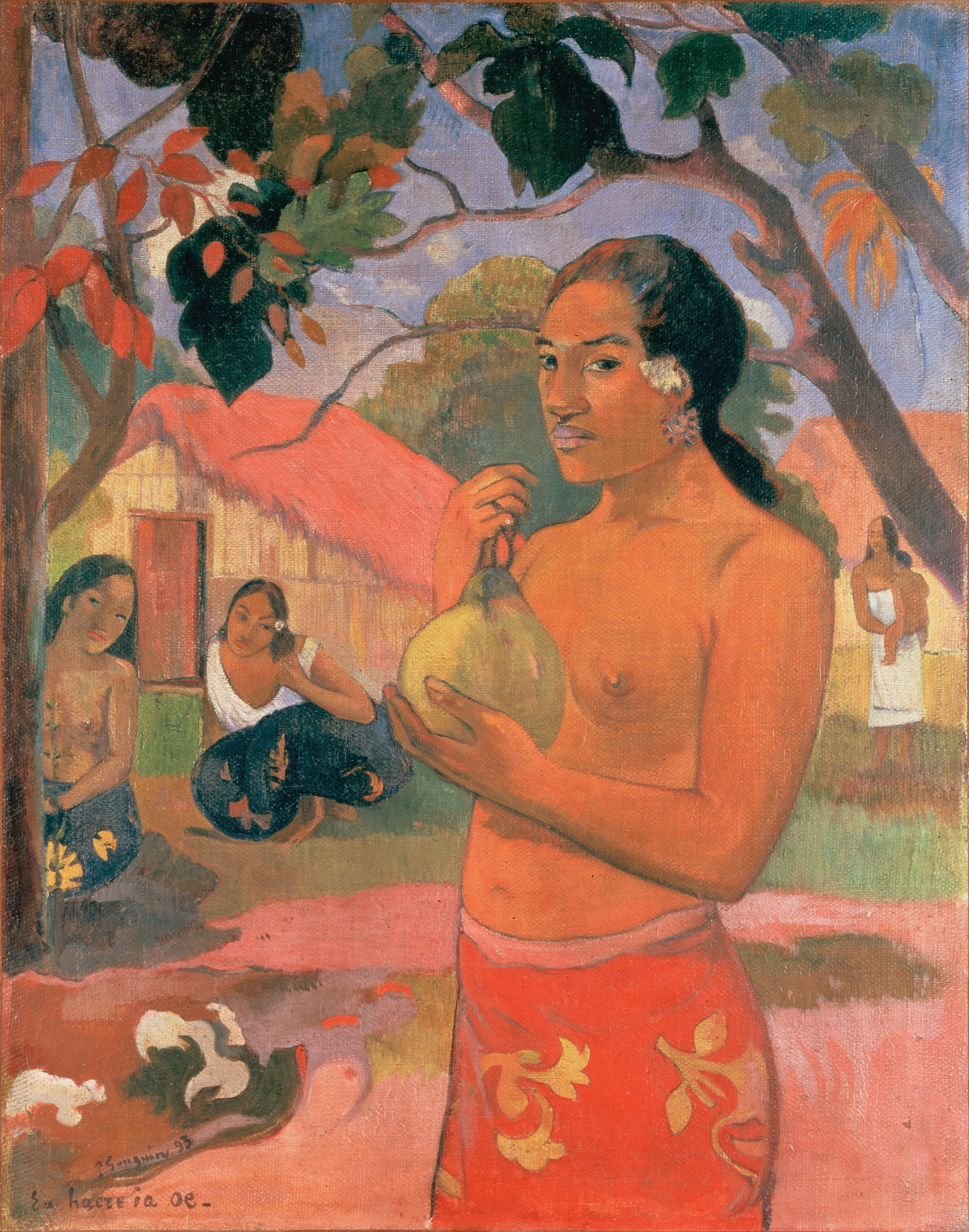
Paul Gauguin, Cueillette de fruits, Hermitage Museum

Vincent van Gogh, Café de nuit

== Sources ==
- К истории международных связей Государственного музея нового западного искусства (1922—1939) / Авт.-сост. Н. В. Яворская; Под ред. И. Е. Даниловой. — М., 1978 (Из архива ГМИИ / Гос. музей изобраз. искусств им. А. С. Пушкина. — Вып. 2). — 475 с.
- Н. В. Яворская. История Государственного музея нового западного искусства (по документам и воспоминаниям) // Искусствознание. — 1/02. — М., 2002. — С. 595–603.
- Н. В. Яворская. История Государственного музея нового западного искусства. Москва. 1918–1948. — М.: ГМИИ им. А. С. Пушкина, 2012. — 480 с.: ил., портр. — ISBN 978-5-903190-50-8 Текст книги был завершён в 1989 году, издан по авторской рукописи при участии ГМИИ им. А. С. Пушкина.
- Figes, Orlando (2007). The Whisperers: Private Life in Stalin's Russia. London: Allen Lane. ISBN 978-0713997026.
- Harris, James (2017). The Great Fear: Stalin's Terror of the 1930s. Oxford University Press. ISBN 978-0198797869.
- A. Artizov, Yu. Sigachev, I. Shevchuk, V. Khlopov under editorship of acad. A. N. Yakovlev. Rehabilitation: As It Happened. Documents of the CPSU CC Presidium and Other Materials. Vol. 2, February 1956–Early 1980s. Moscow, 2003.
- Conquest, Robert (1973) [1968]. The Great Terror: Stalin's Purge of the Thirties (Revised ed.). London: Macmillan. ISBN 978-0-02-527560-7.
- Hoffman, David L., ed. (2003). Stalinism: The Essential Readings. Oxford: Blackwell Publishers. ISBN 978-0-631-22890-5.
- Merridale, Catherine (2002). Night of Stone: Death and Memory in Twentieth-Century Russia. London: Penguin. ISBN 978-0-14-200063-2.
