= Pyotr Shchukin =

Russian art collector

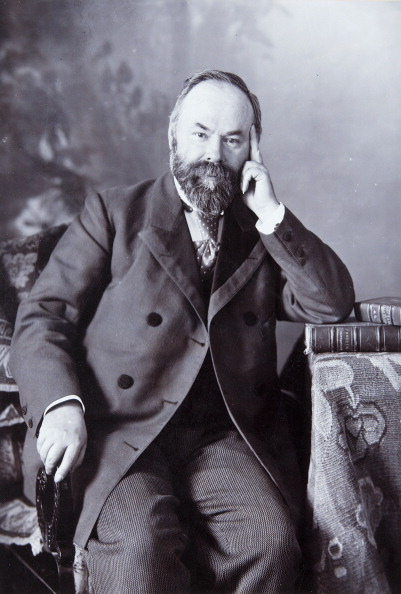
- Pyotr Shchukin
- Born: 1853
- Died: 12 October 1912 (aged 58–59)
- Occupation: Art collector

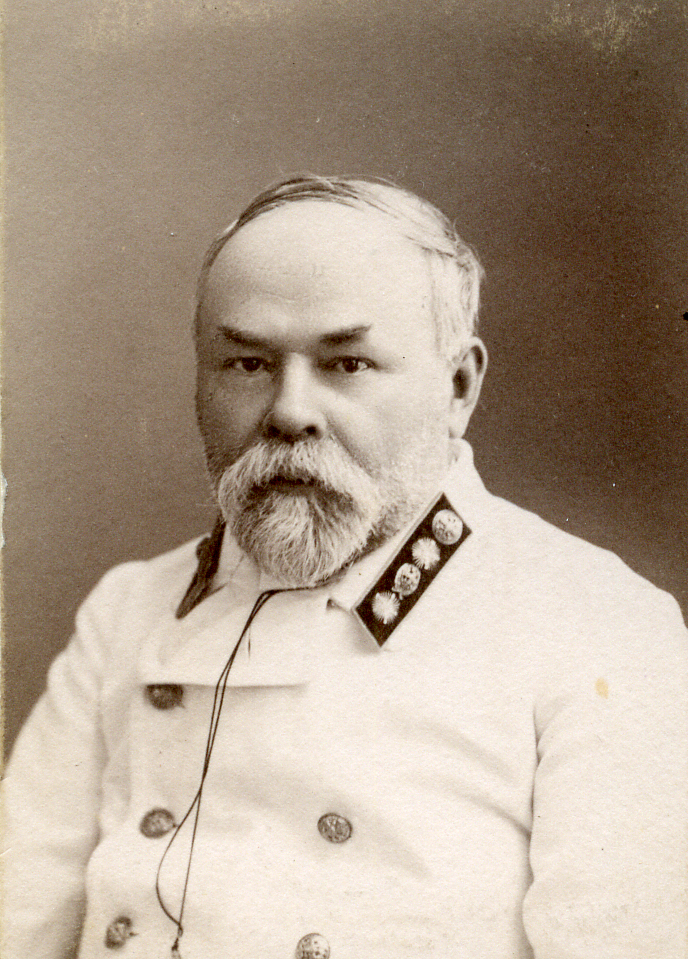
Pyotr Shchukin

Pyotr Ivanovich Shchukin (1853 – 12 October 1912) was an art collector who built an important collection of Russian ancient art and artifacts and owned several impressionist masterpieces.

== Early life and family ==
Pyotr Ivanovich Shchukin was born in 1853, one of ten children of Ivan Vassilievitch Shchukin, a self-made Moscow merchant in the textile trade from an Old Believer background who acquired a wealth of 4 million gold rubles, and his wife Ekaterina Shchukin, the daughter of Pyotr Konovich Botkin, a tea merchant and patron of the arts. I.V. Shchukin and Sons became one of the largest textile companies in Russia.

== Art collecting ==
Shchukin built an important collection of Russian ancient art and artifacts and owned several impressionist masterpieces. His younger brother, Sergei Shchukin, was also a noted art collector while his brother Dimitri Shchukin assembled "Moscow's best collection of Old Masters" that eventually entered the Pushkin Museum. Another brother, Ivan, also collected art.

He was a customer of French art dealer Paul Durand-Ruel and accompanied his brother Sergei on buying trips to Paris.

When Shchukin was blackmailed by a former mistress and needed money to pay her off, he sold his Impressionist paintings to Sergei rather than sell them back to Durand-Ruel for less.

== Death ==
Shchukin died on 12 October 1912.
