= Dance (Matisse) =

1910 painting made by Henri Matisse

- Artist: Henri Matisse
- Year: 1910
- Medium: Oil on canvas
- Movement: Fauvism
- Dimensions: 260 cm × 391 cm (102.4 in × 153.9 in)
- Location: The Hermitage, St. Petersburg

Dance (La Danse) is a painting made by Henri Matisse in 1910, at the request of Russian businessman and art collector Sergei Shchukin, who bequeathed the large decorative panel to the Hermitage Museum, in Saint Petersburg, where it hangs beside Music. The composition of dancing figures is commonly recognized as "a key point of (Matisse's) career and in the development of modern painting". A preliminary version of the work, sketched by Matisse in 1909 as a study for the work, resides at MoMA in New York, where it has been labeled Dance (I).

La Danse was first exhibited at the Salon d'Automne of 1910 (1 October – 8 November), Grand Palais des Champs-Élysées, Paris.

== Dance (I) ==
Dance (I)
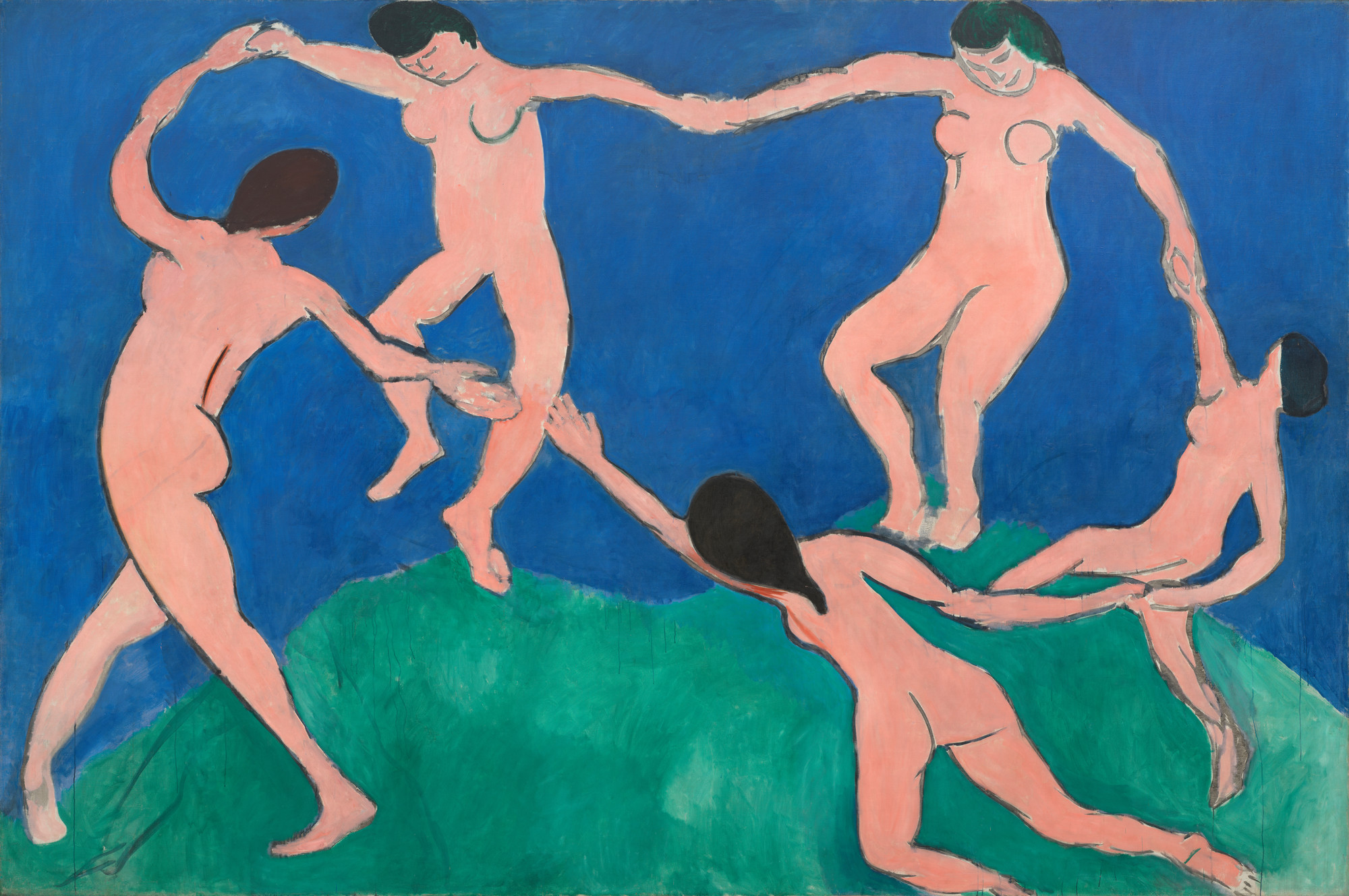
- Artist: Henri Matisse
- Year: 1909
- Catalogue: 79124
- Medium: Oil on canvas
- Dimensions: 259.7 cm × 390.1 cm (102.2 in × 153.6 in)
- Location: Museum of Modern Art, New York City
- Accession: 201.1963

In March 1909, Matisse painted a preliminary version of this work, known as Dance (I). It was a compositional study and uses paler colors and less detail. The painting was highly regarded by the artist who once called it "the overpowering climax of luminosity"; it is also featured in the background of Matisse's Nasturtiums with the Painting "Dance I", (1912).

It was donated by Nelson A. Rockefeller in honor of Alfred H. Barr Jr. to the Museum of Modern Art in New York.

== Dance ==
Dance is a large decorative panel, painted with a companion piece, Music, specifically for the Russian businessman and art collector Sergei Shchukin, with whom Matisse had a long association. Until the October Revolution of 1917, this painting hung together with Music on the staircase of Shchukin's Moscow mansion.

The painting shows five dancing figures, painted in a strong red, set against a very simplified green landscape and deep blue sky. It reflects Matisse's incipient fascination with primitive art, and uses a classic Fauvist color palette: the intense warm colors against the cool blue-green background and the rhythmical succession of dancing nudes convey the feelings of emotional liberation and hedonism. The painting is often associated with the "Dance of the Young Girls" from Igor Stravinsky's famous 1913 musical work The Rite of Spring. The composition or arrangement of dancing figures is reminiscent of Blake's watercolour "Oberon, Titania and Puck with fairies dancing" from 1786.

Dance is commonly recognized as "a key point of (Matisse's) career and in the development of modern painting". It resides in the Hermitage Museum in St. Petersburg. It was loaned to H'ART Museum for a period of six weeks from April 1 to May 9, 2010.

== La Danse (Verve) ==
The French art periodical Verve published a lithographic version of the Hermitage La Danse in its Volume 1, Issue 4, January–March 1939. On page 50 of this issue, it is stated: "Henri Matisse has painted for Verve a replica of his large painting, La Danse . . .. This is reproduced lithographically on the following pages [book-ended by two linocuts of skaters in motion]." The lithography was carried out by Mourlot Freres (Paris). This lithographic version is, with margins, 14" × 25" and therefore much smaller than the painted versions. The lithographic version is hardly a "replica" of the Hermitage version, as several differences can be readily observed:

(1) the green area in the lithographic version is a lime green.

(2) the sky is virtually black (but with some blue near borders and edges of figures),

(3) color areas are internally uniform, eschewing any painterly effects,

(4) the lines in the figures are thicker, giving the image - with its uniform color areas – somewhat the appearance of a woodcut, and

(5) the entire image is surrounded by a "frame" consisting of flat yellow, blue, and black color areas. The entire lithograph has the look of a genre that Matisse invented in the late 1930s, namely, the colored-paper cut-out and lithographic versions thereof.

== See also ==
- List of works by Henri Matisse
