= Sergei Shchukin =

Russian art collector (1854–1936)

Sergey Ivanovich Shchukin
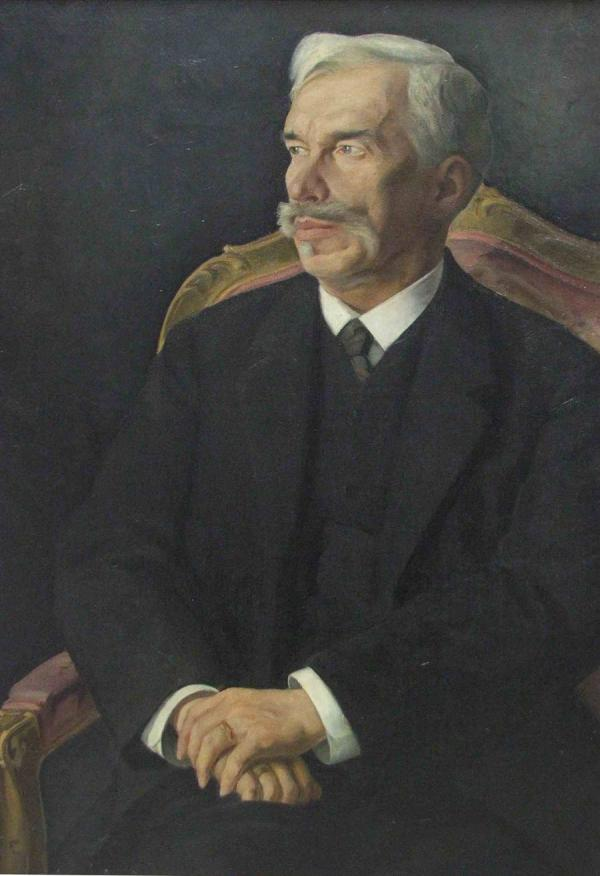
- 1915 portrait
- Born: July 27, 1854; Moscow, Russian Empire
- Died: January 10, 1936 (aged 81); Paris, French Third Republic
- Occupation: Art collector

Sergei Ivanovich Shchukin (Russian: Сергей Иванович Щукин; 6 July [O.S. 24 June] 1854 – 10 January 1936) was a Russian businessman who became an art collector, mainly of French Impressionist and Post-Impressionist art.

== Early life and family ==
Sergei Ivanovich Shchukin was born on 6 July [O.S. 24 June] 1854 in Moscow, one of ten children of Ivan Shchukin, a self-made Moscow merchant, and his wife Ekaterina Shchukina, née Botkin, the daughter of an established family of merchants. I.V. Shchukin and Sons Trading Company became one of the largest manufacturing and wholesale companies in Russia.

== Art collection ==
There were several art collectors in the Shchukin family. Sergei's brother Pyotr Shchukin built an important collection of Russian ancient art and artifacts and owned several impressionist masterpieces, while his brother Dimitri Shchukin assembled "Moscow's best collection of Old Masters," which eventually entered the Pushkin Museum. Another brother, Ivan, also collected art and books.

Shchukin made his first art purchases following a trip to Paris in 1897, when he bought his first Monet. He later bought numerous works to a total of 258 paintings decorating the walls of his palatial home in Moscow.

By 1914, Shchukin owned thirteen Monet paintings, including the iconic Lady in the Garden and the smaller but complete version of Picnic; three by Renoir; eight by Cézanne, including Carnival (Mardi Gras); four by Van Gogh, including the Portrait of Dr. Felix Rey (but the most famous Van Gogh paintings in Russia, Prison Courtyard and The Red Vineyard, were purchased by Shchukin's friend and competitor, Ivan Abramovitch Morozov); sixteen by Gauguin of the Tahitian period, which were hung in his dining room in the manner of an orthodox iconostasis; seven by Henri Rousseau; sixteen by André Derain; eight by Albert Marquet; and two by Maxime Dethomas.

Shchukin was particularly notable for his long association with Matisse, who decorated his mansion and created one of his iconic paintings, La Danse, specially for Shchukin. La Danse is commonly recognized as "a key point of [Matisse's] career and in the development of modern painting". Henri Matisse created La Danse for Shchukin as part of a two-painting commission, the other important painting being Music, 1910. Both paintings are now in the collection of the Hermitage Museum in Saint Petersburg. An earlier version of La Danse (1909) is in the collection of The Museum of Modern Art in New York City.

The collection also featured fifty choice works by Pablo Picasso, including most of his earliest Cubist works, such as Three Women and major landscapes, but some key pieces of the Blue and Rose periods as well. In 1909, Shchukin opened his home on Sundays for public viewings, introducing French avant-garde painting to the Muscovites.

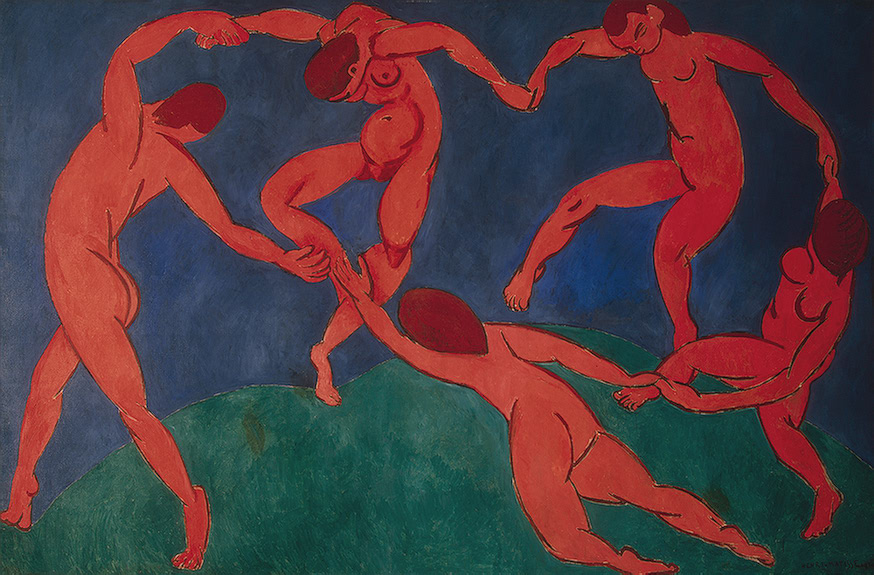
Henri Matisse, The Dance (second version), 1910, 260 x 391 cm, The Hermitage, (Matisse's second version of the painting).

=== After the revolution ===
After the 1917 Revolution, the government appropriated his collection (decree of the Council of the People's Commissioners, signed Lenin, 8 November 1918) while Shchukin escaped to Paris, where he died in 1936. His mansion in Moscow became the State Museum of New Western Art (Государственный Музей нового западного искусствa, section I), section II being the mansion and collection of the other famous Russian patron, Ivan Morozov. Eventually, in 1928, the two sections were merged and exhibited in the former Ivan Morozov mansion at Prechistenka, 21. In 1948 the State Museum of New Western Art was closed down by a decree signed by Stalin due to its allegedly bourgeois, cosmopolitan and wrongly oriented artworks. The two collections were randomly divided between the Pushkin Museum of Fine Arts and the State Hermitage Museum in St. Petersburg.

=== Compensation efforts ===
Shchukin's art collection has been jointly displayed with the collection of Ivan Morozov. In 2008, the families of Shchukin and Morozov made efforts to compel Russia to provide them with “reasonable compensation,” which become an international legal and political issue. The families refused an offer from the British Royal Academy of £5,000 for each family in exchange for their promise not to make claims on the paintings while they were on loan to the Royal Academy, which was displaying the two collections in London.

== Death and legacy ==
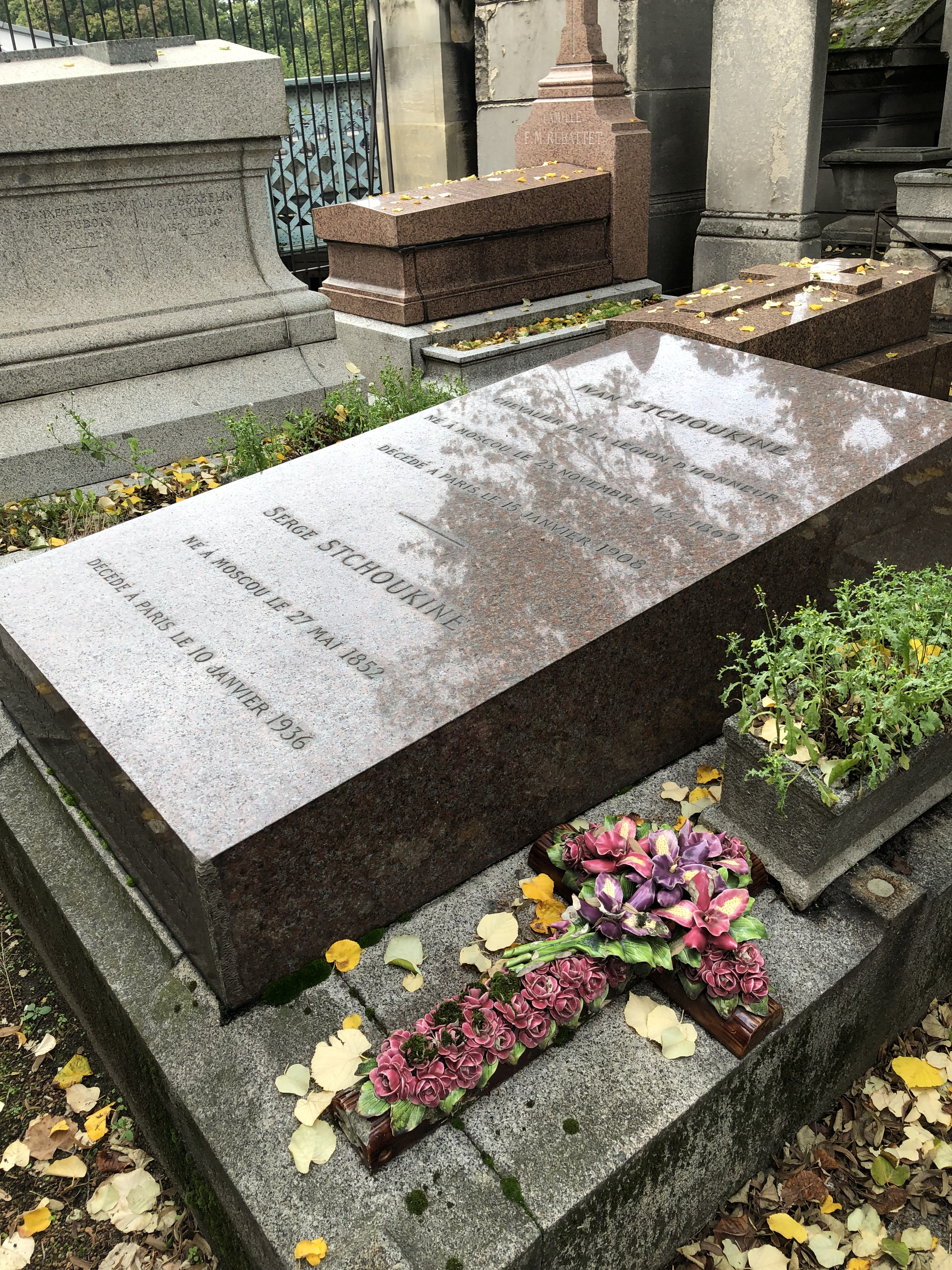
Shchukin's grave in Montmartre Cemetery.

Shchukin died on 10 January 1936 in Paris and is buried in Montmartre Cemetery, Avenue des Polonais 1st Division.

Irina Antonova, director of the Pushkin Museum, remarked of Shchukin:

He started to collect unpopular art, which was snubbed by the Louvre and other museums. It was his personal taste. Perhaps he heard foreshocks that would change the world. Such a collector could appear only in a country that awaited a revolution. He collected art that prefigured the global cataclysms.

In the autumn of 2016, the exhibition "Icônes de l'art moderne. La collection Chtchoukine", opened at the Louis Vuitton Foundation in Paris.
