= The Green Stripe =

Painting by Henri Matisse

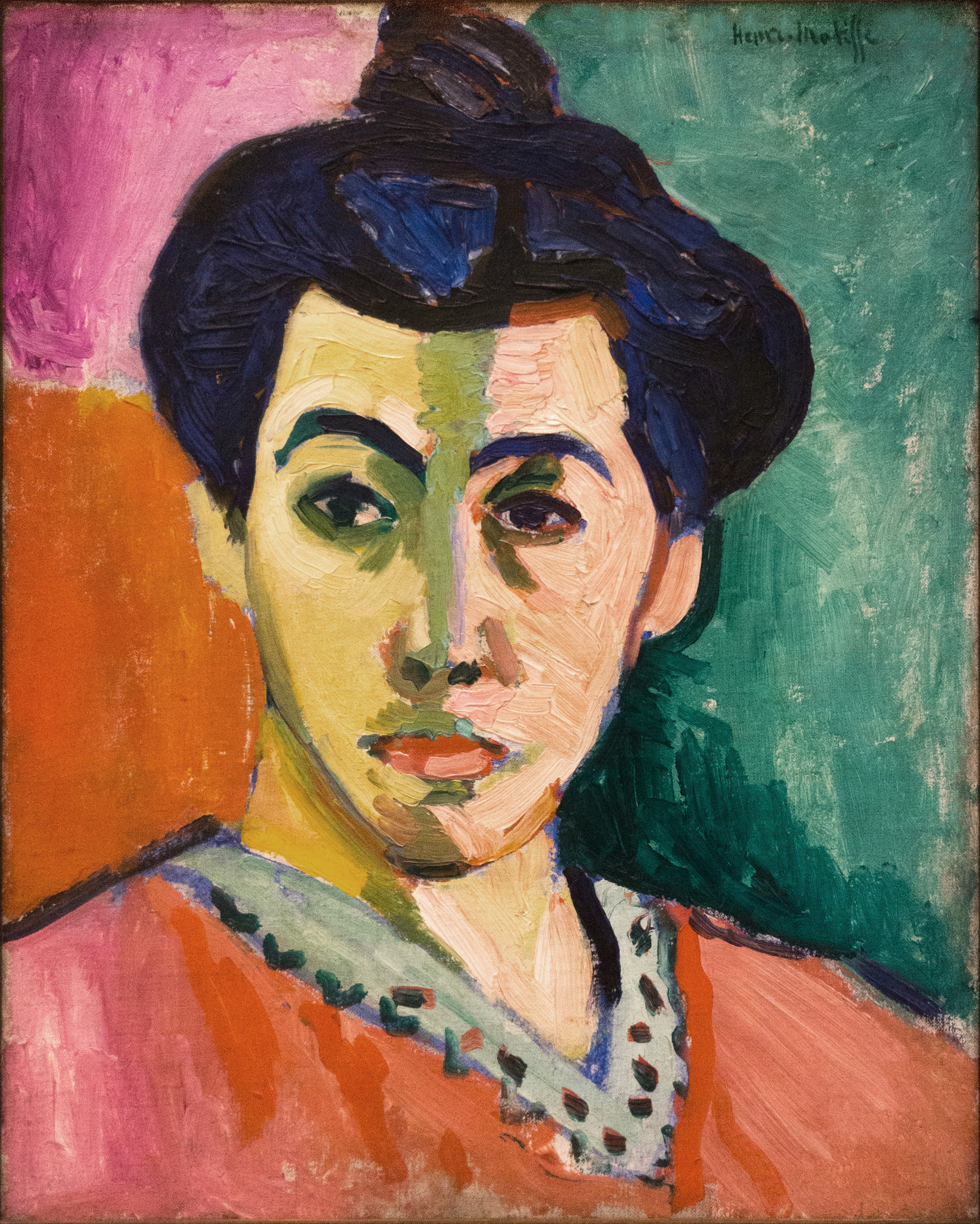
- Artist: Henri Matisse
- Year: 1905
- Medium: Oil on canvas
- Movement: Fauvism
- Dimensions: 40.5 cm × 32.5 cm (15.9 in × 12.8 in)
- Location: Statens Museum for Kunst, Copenhagen

The Green Stripe (also known as The Green Line or Madame Matisse) is an oil painting from 1905 by French artist Henri Matisse of his wife, Amélie Noellie Matisse-Parayre. The title stems from the vertical green stripe down the middle of Madame Matisse's face, an artistic decision consistent with the techniques and values of Fauvism. The painting features a bust-length view of Madame Matisse in blocks of bold and vibrant colors. It is associated with the Fauvist Movement due to this unnatural and experimental use of color. The portrait has received both praise and criticism due to this technique as well as the artistic representation of the model. The Green Stripe is currently displayed in the Staten Museum for Kunst in Copenhagen, Denmark.

== Fauvist context ==
Matisse spent the summer of 1905 painting and drawing in the Mediterranean fishing town of Collioure, France with fellow artist André Derain. During this time, Matisse and Derain explored the role of color in their art, using blotches of bright and bold colors that did not always follow the actual natural coloring of their subject. This experimental summer was foundational to the movement now known as Fauvism, which was characterized by vibrant and unnatural colors and the simplification of line.

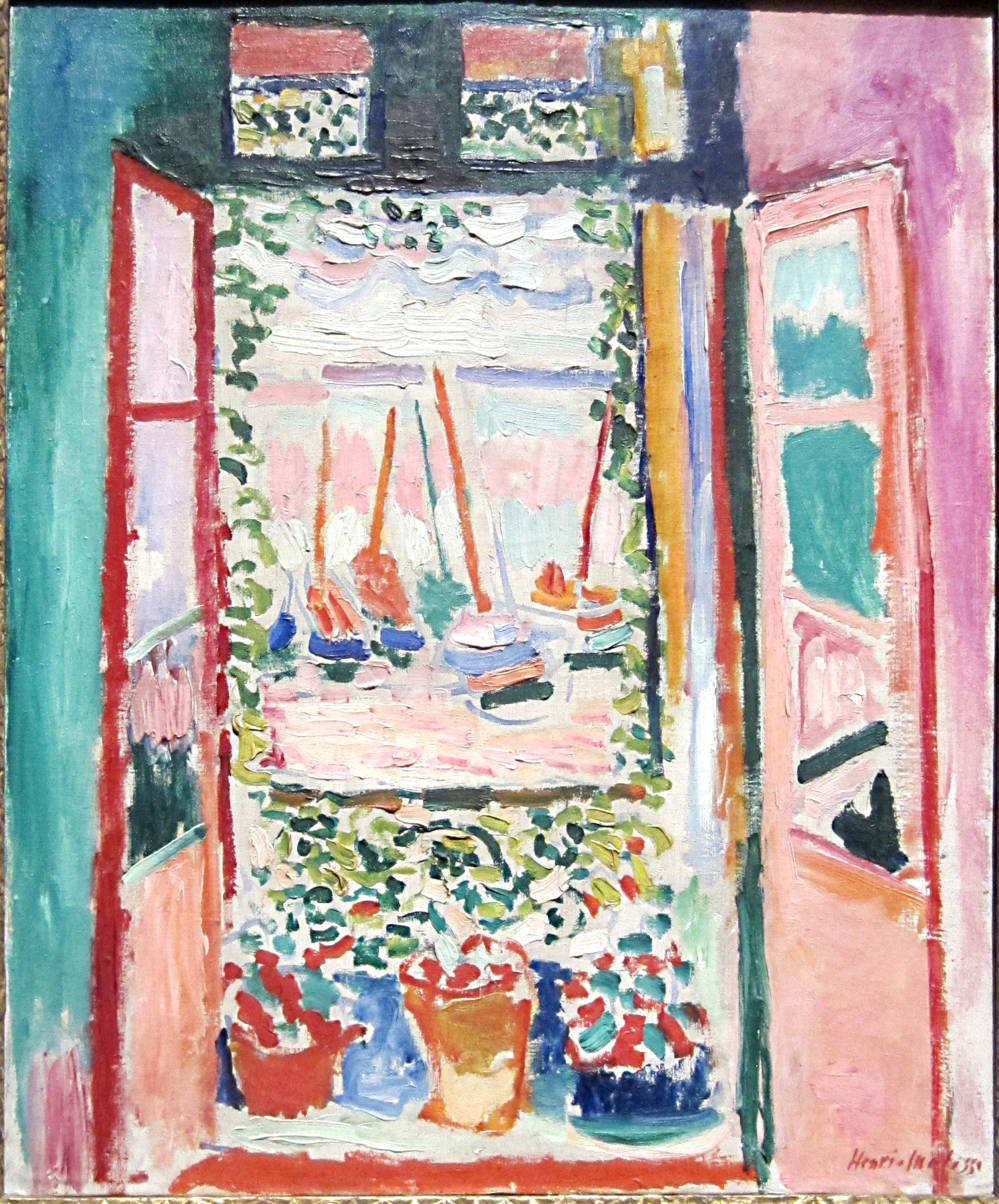
Open Window, Collioure by Henri Matisse (1905)

Matisse and Derain were leaders in this movement. Matisse spoke about color as "a force." He said, "My paintings consist of four or five colors which clash with one another expressively. When I apply green, that does not mean grass. When I apply blue, that does not mean sky. It is their accord or their opposition which opens in the viewer’s mind an illusory space." This nontraditional use of color is seen in The Green Stripe and was controversial in the art world. One critic described the artists as "les fauves" or "wild beasts" who offended the viewer with their outrageous and unnatural colors. This insult effectively named the movement Fauvism.

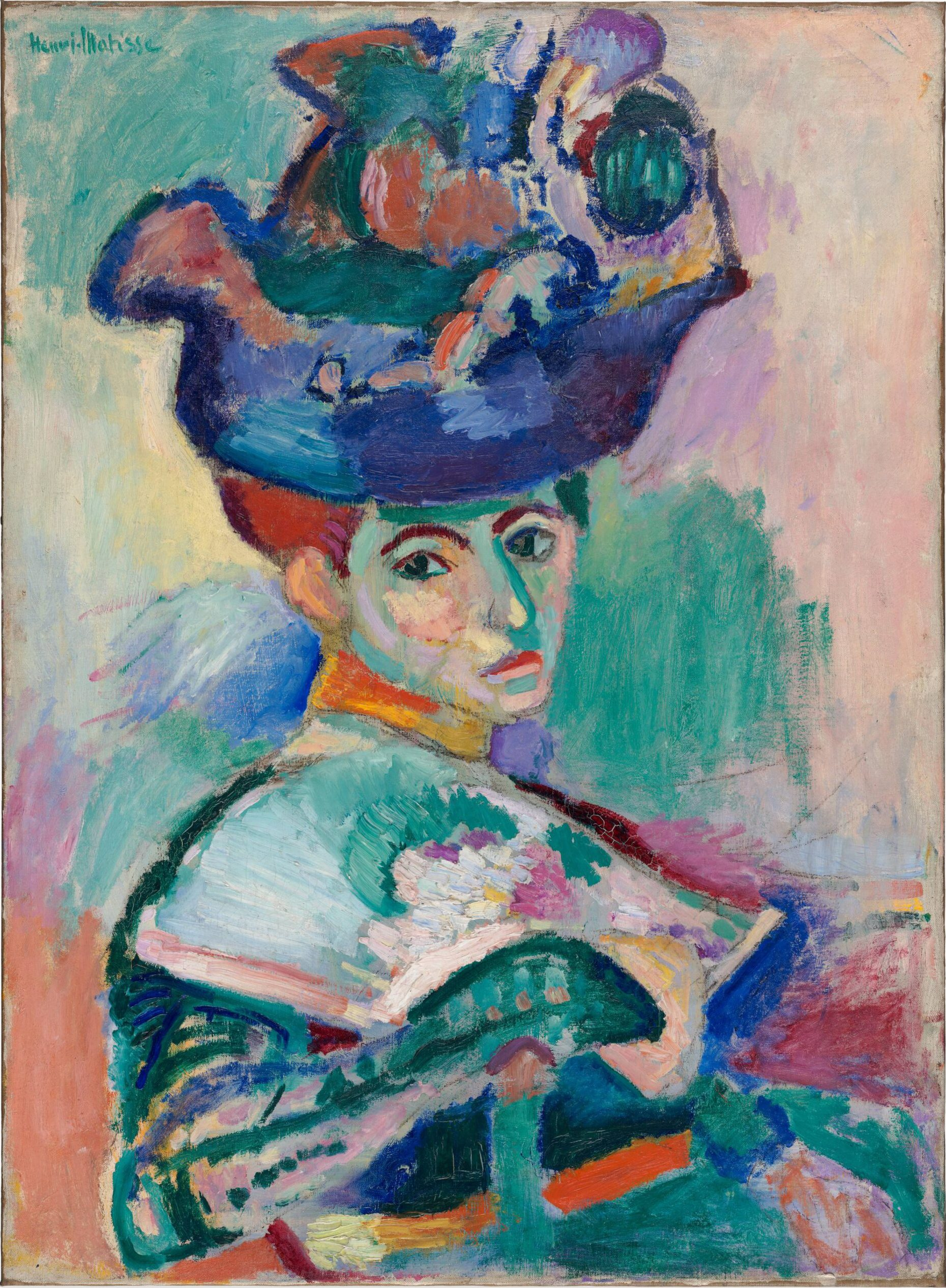
Woman with a Hat by Henri Matisse (1905)

During Matisse’s time in Collioure, he created multiple iconic Fauvist paintings in addition to The Green Stripe. Other famous paintings from this period include The Open Window, Collioure and Woman with a Hat. The Green Stripe was made within months of Woman with a Hat and the paintings have commonly been understood to be in dialogue with each other.

== Analysis ==
The Green Stripe depicts the bust of Madame Amélie Matisse with one side of her face in direct light, indicated by pink with orange and red along her chin and ear, and the other side painted yellow, indicating half-light. The middle of her face famously has a vertical streak of green from her hairline down her nose to her top lip. Her hair, eyebrows, and eyes are all a deep blue and she is dressed in an orange and pink blouse or dress with a teal neckline. The background is split between pink and orange on one side and teal on the other side.

These bold colors are organized into sections that define Madame Matisse's facial features and the lighting of the room wherein she is seated. These blocks of pure color are similar to the techniques of Gauguin and Van Gogh and show development in Matisse's approach to color as he moved away from Impressionism. This evolution can be seen in the contrast between Woman with a Hat and The Green Stripe, which both depict Amélie. Matisse employed shorter paint strokes and a variety of intermingling colors in Woman with a Hat, creating a whimsical environment that does not delve into the character of the subject. The Green Stripe is more serious and intimate with harder lines and a focus on Amelie’s face. Intensity and life come from the purity of color and the tension between the contrasting colors in each part of her face. Even with this closeness, the model still seems mysterious and almost nonhuman.

The conversation between Woman with a Hat and The Green Stripe shows how Amélie was nothing but a model in these paintings. Matisse prioritized his artistic vision and message over the actual personality of the sitter, his wife. Critics and friends alike were unsettled by the lack of humanity in this portrait. A friend of the painting's owners Michael and Sarah Stein called it "a demented caricature of a portrait," and in 1910 the critic Gelett Burgess wrote that The Green Stripe was Matisse's "punishment" of Amélie that compelled the viewer "to see in her a strange and terrible aspect." The art historian John Klein has suggested that difficulties in the Matisses' marriage may have contributed to the portrait's impersonal and mask-like character.

== See also ==
- List of works by Henri Matisse
