= Robert Deborne =

French impressionist painter

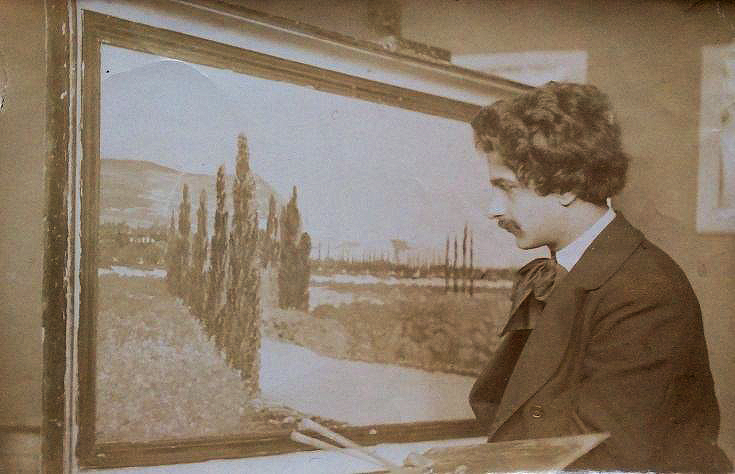
- Robert Deborne
- Born: 22 July 1870; Ardèche, France
- Died: 27 July 1944 (aged 74); Ardèche, France
- Known for: Painting, drawing, and landscapes
- Movement: Post-Impressionist, Fauvism
- Elected: Salon d'Automne

Robert Deborne (French pronunciation: [ʁɔbɛʁ dəbɔʁn]; 22 July 1870 – 27 July 1944), was a French Post-Impressionist painter born in Viviers, in 1870. He focused on painting landscapes of Viviers and the surrounding countryside as well as Nebbio, in Corsica. Deborne is best remembered for his Post-Impressionist works, and his contribution to Fauvism.

== Personal life ==
Deborne was born in 1870 in Viviers, France to Robert François Abel Deborne and Clémence Barruol. His father was a wealthy landowner and this provided him with the financial security to concentrate on painting. Little is known about Deborne's childhood. He attended school in Lyon before marrying and moving to Meudon, Paris in 1900. In 1903 he exhibited in The Paris Salon and, in 1905, the Salon d'Automne. Deborne and his wife had two children before they divorced in 1923. He died in his studio in Ardèche on July 27, 1944, at the age of 74.

== Work ==
Deborne mostly painted scenes of Viviers, his home town on the Rhône, and its surrounding areas. His works are very much centered on the places that he loved. He returned to the same landscapes again and again to depict the variations in time, weather and season.

== Salon d'Automne ==
Deborne exhibited at the Salon d'Automne between 1905 and 1927 and was accepted as a member of the Salon d'Automne 1923. Deborne was inspired by the work of Cézanne, and he exhibited with Cézanne on at least two occasions: in the 1905 Salon d'Automne. 3e Exposition, and the 1906 Salon d'Automne. 4e Exposition. Deborne exhibited at the Salon d'Automne in 1905, the year when the press coined the then rather disparaging term of Fauves (French for ‘wild beasts’) to describe artists using strong, separate, unnatural colours in a representational manner, moving away from the realism of impressionism. The phrase stuck and the new movement of Fauvism was recognised, of which Deborne was certainly a part and influenced by.

== Friendship with Signac ==
In 1928, the President of the Salon des Indépendants asked Deborne to find housing in Bourg-Saint-Andéol, and then in Viviers for Paul Signac. The two painters would meet and paint together on the banks of the Rhône. Signac and Deborne went on to exhibit together on several occasions at the Salon du Sud-Est.

== Gallery ==
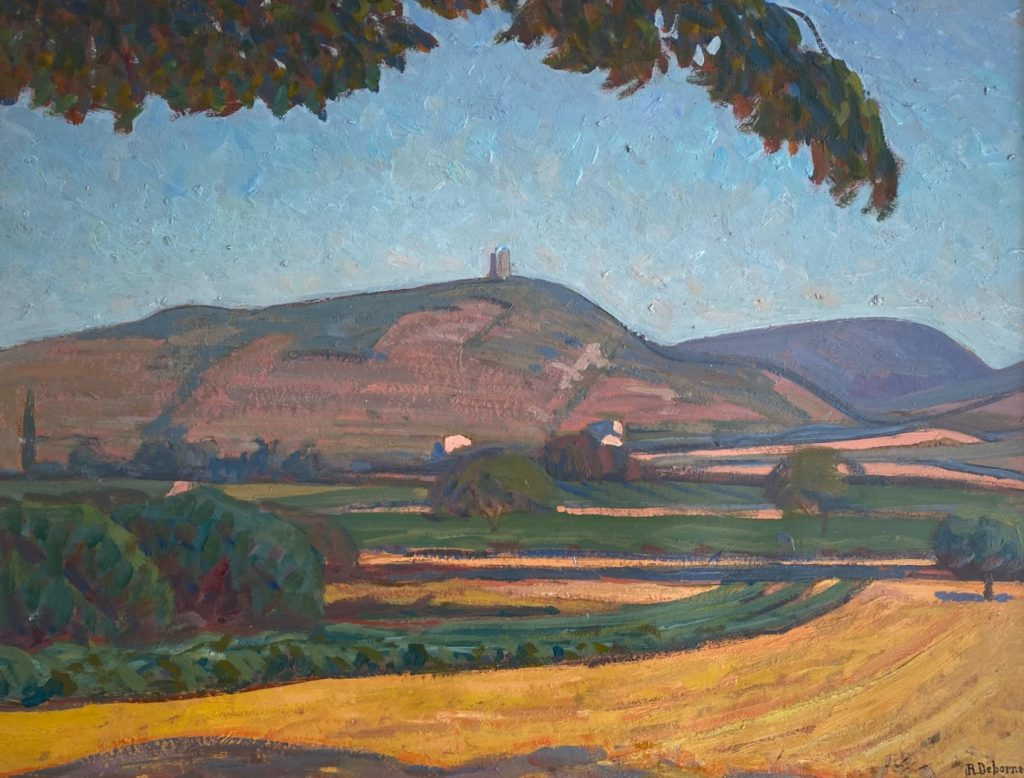
Hilltop Tower by Robert Deborne

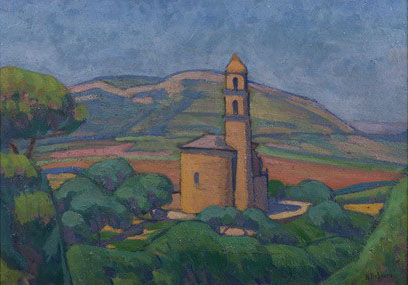
Deborne Painting of Church

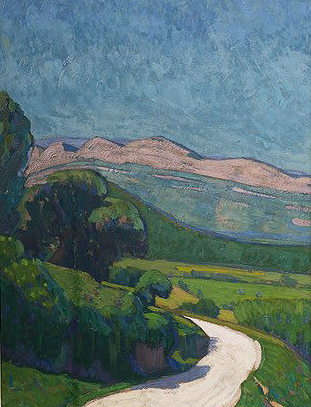
Country Lane
