= Albert Marque =

French sculptor

Albert Marque (French pronunciation: [albɛʁ maʁk]; 14 July 1872 – 1939) was a French sculptor and doll maker of the late 19th and early 20th centuries.

== Life and work ==
Marque was born in 1872 in Nanterre, Hauts-de-Seine. He became well-known and respected at the turn of the 20th century, especially for his sculpting of children.

== Confusion with Albert Marquet and relationship to Fauvism ==
Marque is sometimes confused for or conflated with Albert Marquet, a French Fauvist painter born three years later. This confusion of artists with similar name and age and from the same country is compounded by the fact that Henri Matisse often repeated the generally accepted story of the origin of the term Fauvism which involved Marque. According to Matisse's story, art critic Louis Vauxcelles saw a bust created by Marque on display where it was surrounded by the brash Fauvist paintings (including by Marquet) and proclaimed, "Donatello chez les fauves" ("Donatello among the wild beasts"). Both Marquet and Marque are listed as exhibiting works in the Salone d'Automne of 1905.

== A. Marque dolls ==
During World War I, Albert Marque was persuaded by the Parisian couture fashion house of Jeanne Margaine-Lacroix to sculpt one hundred fashion dolls which were then clothed in custom-made outfits. The dolls were exhibited in Paris in 1915. Some were sold and others were kept in the Margaine-Lacroix inventory. The dolls were dressed in costumes, often representing regional French royalty or peasantry. They are considered to be artistic works celebrating France and French culture, particularly as a response in wartime to the popularity of German dolls, and created for adults rather than as toys for children.

These dolls became known as "A. Marque" dolls from the mark placed on the dolls by the sculptor. The dolls have become highly valued in doll collecting. They are generally considered the most desirable dolls by collectors and demand the highest price of any dolls. On March 29, 2014, an A. Marque doll, a boy number 27, set the world record for an antique doll at auction by Theriault's, fetching US$300,000. This broke the previous world record of US$263,000 —- also for an A. Marque doll.

In her work for the Doll Artisan Guild, Ragnhild Margareta Ericson catalogs twenty-five known A. Marque dolls. Stuart Holbrook, the president of Theriault's (the leading auction firm dealing with dolls and childhood ephemera, who have handled the majority of A. Marque dolls that have come to auction), also notes there are only about twenty A. Marque dolls in existence. Michael Canadas of Carmel Doll Shop of Pacific Grove California, who has had five A. Marque Dolls sold through his shop, concurs that perhaps twenty A. Marque Dolls currently survive, although the original number of one hundred may, or may not, be correct. Doll collector authorities refers to the A. Marque as the "Holy Grail of collectible dolls". Holbrook and Theriault's contribute strongly to the allure of A. Marque dolls. Says Holbrook, "The A. Marque has always been a doll of great mystique for collectors. Every collectible category has that "one piece" - the one item, or name, that blends rarity, beauty, and allure; for dolls it is the Marque, and it will perhaps remain so forever."
