= Sarah Stein =

American art collector and painter

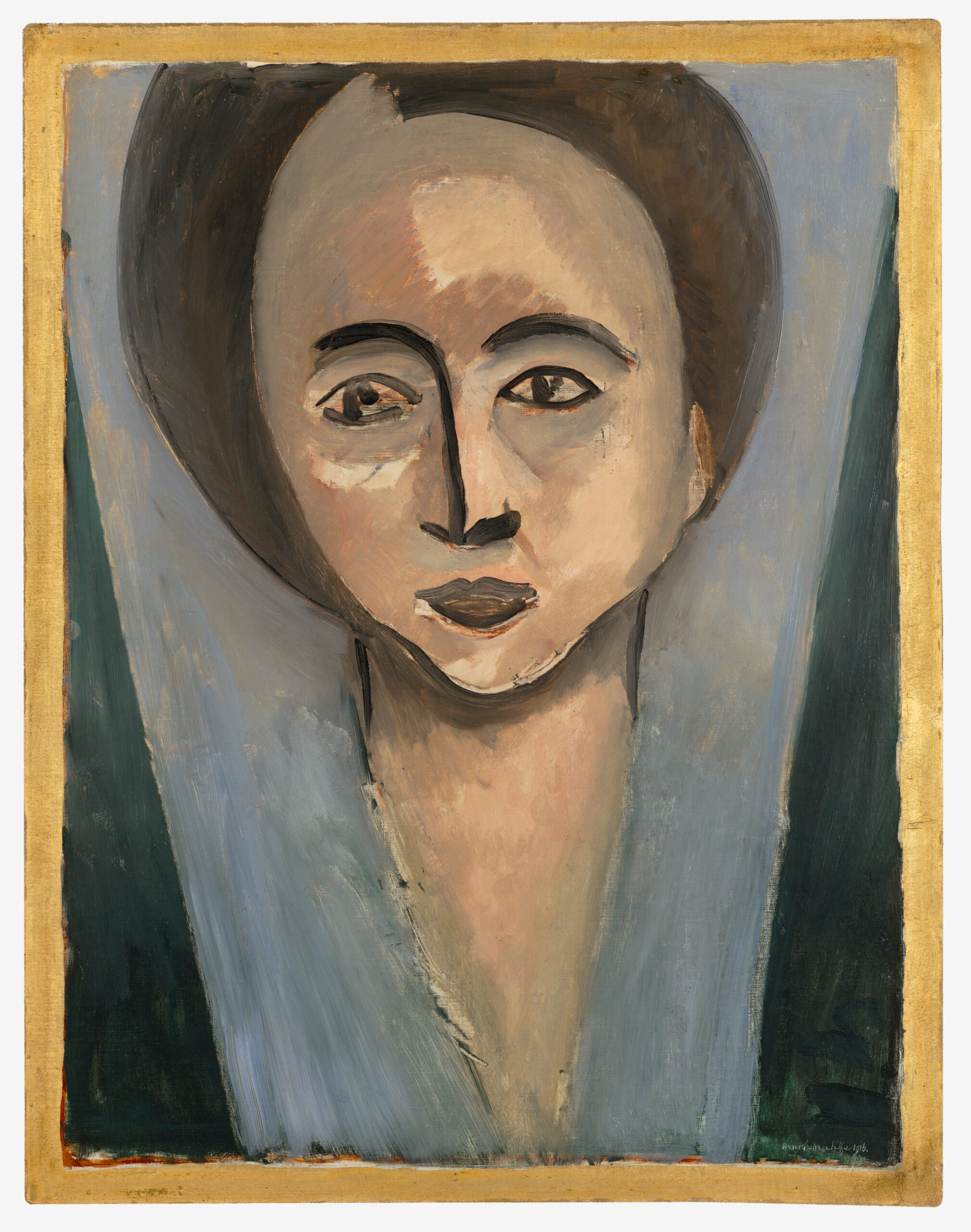
- Portrait of Sarah Stein
- Born: Sarah Samuels; July 26, 1870; San Francisco, California, United States
- Died: 1953 (aged 82–83); San Francisco
- Occupation: Collector
- Spouse: Michael Stein
- Children: Allan Daniel Stein
- Relatives: Gertrude Stein (sister-in-law); Leo Stein (brother-in-law)
- Writing career
- Period: 20th century
- Subject: Modernism

Sarah Stein (née Samuels) (July 26, 1870 – 1953) was an American art collector. With her husband Michael Stein, the older brother of Leo Stein and Gertrude Stein, she lived in Paris from 1903 to 1935. She supported and popularized the painter Henri Matisse.

== Early life ==
Sarah Samuels was born in San Francisco. She was the daughter of a wealthy German-Jewish merchant. She was given the nickname "Sally" by Jack London.

She married Michael Stein in March 1894. They had one child, Allan Daniel Stein, who was born on November 1, 1895, in San Francisco. Michael sold a streetcar business in 1903 and moved with Sarah and Allan to Paris in the same year.

== Paris ==
Sarah and her husband lived mostly in and out of Paris. "The couple was ... educated, and up-to-date. They collected art and tried to keep abreast of the latest trends in education, health, and philosophy."

Sarah and Michael lived in conventional bourgeois comfort as they accumulated paintings and other objects with as much enthusiasm as Leo and Gertrude Stein. The couple concentrated almost exclusively on the work of Henri Matisse, beginning with their first purchase (with Leo and Gertrude) of Woman with a Hat at the Salon d'Automne in 1905. Sarah next bought Matisse's La Raie verte (The Green Line) (1905), another of the misunderstood masterpieces from the mythical Salle des Fauves. She was one of Matisse's staunchest friends and supporters from 1905 until she and her husband left Paris in the 1930s. In 1906, on a visit to the U.S. after the San Francisco earthquake, Sarah and her husband brought Matisse's work to America, and later took occasional commissions to secure other examples of his works for American collectors. In 1907, Matisse included the Steins' son Allan in his 1907 painting Boy With a Butterfly Net.

In 1908, with financial support from Michael, Sarah persuaded Matisse to open a school of painting. Matisse converted his studio at an old convent building on the rue de Sèvres into a school in which he could instruct a chosen few. At a time when Matisse was in considerable economic distress, Sarah made him her hero, and many of her evenings at home with guests became opportunities for her to defend the work of this man who, she was convinced, was a great master. Sarah took informal instruction from Matisse. In her notes for the class, the most detailed record of what went on that has survived, Matisse sounded humanistic rather than radical. He stressed the value of working from the antique, and condemned any modern neglect of spiritual values.

The Steins were among the Americans who loaned Matisse's work to the 1913 Armory Show, two examples that provided the largest public in America with its first close look at a notorious modernist. In 1914, the Steins agreed to lend nineteen of their finest canvases to Berlin, for an exhibition in Fritz Gurlitt's Gallery. World War I blocked their works in Germany and they were never recovered. Later, in 1925, the couple bought the panoramic Tea (1919), giving it a central spot in their Palo Alto home after 1935.

Sarah and her husband also instituted a weekly open house where they showed their growing collection. "The popular Saturday evening gatherings held at 58 rue Madame, the remodeled parish house into which the elder Steins moved soon after their arrival in Paris, ... provided Sarah with a captive audience for he disquisitions on Matisse's genius." Sarah used the open houses as a forum in which to talk about and ideas.

Sarah Stein left little evidence of her religious views. But at least in art, and in the realm of humanities, Sarah was religious. If she did not attend the synagogue, she did attend to the ways in which works of art could penetrate into the visible world.

Her commitment to the art of Henri Matisse -as a collector of his work, and as his student and friend- was unshakable and resulted in the formation of not only the Stein's own art collection but also of the Cone sisters, Etta and Claribel, in Baltimore for whom she and Michael acquired numerous pictures.

== Religion ==
By 1908 Sarah had embraced the teaching of Christian Science. Sarah became a Christian Science "practitioner" or "healer". The new religion was becoming increasingly popular among educated, progressive women like herself, particularly well-to-do Reform Jews. Stein embraced Christian Science as the religion emphasized specific family and health, two priorities she already had in her life.

== Villa Stein-de Monzie ==
Sarah and Michael were patrons of both the art and architecture. Within the couple, their art collection reflected Sarah's interests, including spirituality. Les Terrases (Villa Stein) at Garches in the suburbs of Paris is a large and luxurious house that Le Corbusier designed in the 1920s. The house was commissioned for Sarah, Michael and a friend, Gabrielle Colaco-Osorio de Monzie (1882–1961). Stein and Gabrielle de Monzie met through the Christian Science community before meeting Le Corbusier. They wanted to build a home that was a single household among them. Construction took place between 1926 and 1928. For the Steins and their friend the house represented a realization of their years spent in Paris. Very little has been published about the contributions of the Steins and Madam de Monzie as clients, or as participants in the process of building.

Stein shared many of Le Corbusier's aesthetic interests in modern art.

== Later life ==
The Steins returned to the U.S. in 1935, bringing their art collection with them to California. They purchased a home on Kingsley Avenue in Palo Alto.

The Steins were fond of modern theories of health and fitness, and took up stringent new diets and exercise regimens. They believed depressions and anxieties could be relived through physical self-discipline. The Steins also took interest in psychology and medicine, and Sarah in particular followed her sister-in-law's progress at Radcliffe. Sarah's letters from San Francisco are full of questions about Gertrude's course.

When Stein began to slowly sell her art collection before her 1953 death, Elise Stern Haas, the wife of Walter A. Haas, purchased a Matisse portrait of Sarah. Haas convinced a Chicago collector, Nathan Cummings, to acquire a similar portrait of Michael. Haas intended both to be a part of the new art collection of the San Francisco Museum of Modern Art.

== Tribute ==
Saxophonist Benny Golson dedicates a piece to him in his album "Free" (1963): "Shades Of Stein". The track features coltrane changes.
