= Fauvism =

Early 20th-century artistic style

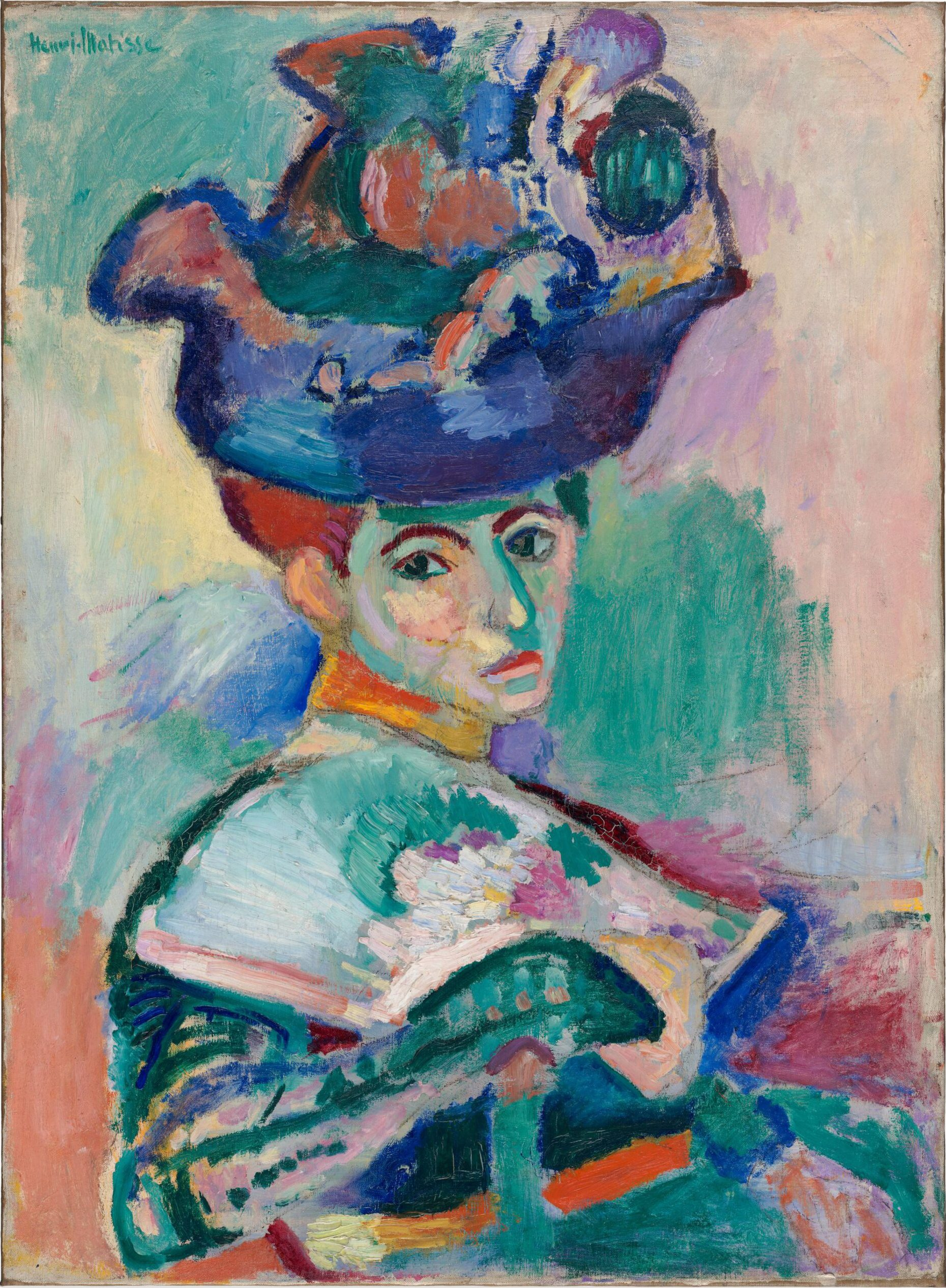
Henri Matisse. Woman with a Hat, 1905. San Francisco Museum of Modern Art

Fauvism (/foʊvɪzəm/ FOH-viz-əm) is a style of painting and an art movement that emerged in France at the beginning of the 20th century. It was the style of les Fauves (French pronunciation: [le fov], the wild beasts), a group of modern artists whose works emphasized painterly qualities and strong color over the representational or realistic values retained by Impressionism. While Fauvism as a style began around 1904 and continued beyond 1910, the movement as such lasted only a few years, 1905–1908, and had three exhibitions. The leaders of the movement were André Derain and Henri Matisse.

== Artists and style ==
Besides Matisse and Derain, other artists included Robert Deborne, Albert Marquet, Charles Camoin, Bela Czobel, Louis Valtat, Jean Puy, Maurice de Vlaminck, Henri Manguin, Raoul Dufy, Othon Friesz, Adolphe Wansart, Georges Rouault, Jean Metzinger, Kees van Dongen, Émilie Charmy and Georges Braque (subsequently Picasso's partner in Cubism).

The paintings of the Fauves were characterized by seemingly wild brushwork and strident colors, while their subject matter had a high degree of simplification and abstraction. Fauvism can be classified as an extreme development of Van Gogh's Post-Impressionism fused with the pointillism of Seurat and other Neo-Impressionist painters, in particular Paul Signac. Other key influences were Paul Cézanne and Paul Gauguin, whose employment of areas of saturated color—notably in paintings from Tahiti—strongly influenced Derain's work at Collioure in 1905. In 1888, Gauguin had said to Paul Sérusier: "How do you see these trees? They are yellow. So, put in yellow; this shadow, rather blue, paint it with pure ultramarine; these red leaves? Put in vermilion." Fauvism has been compared to Expressionism, both in its use of pure color and unconstrained brushwork. Some of the Fauves were among the first avant-garde artists to collect and study African and Oceanic art, alongside other forms of non-Western and folk art, leading several Fauves toward the development of Cubism.

== Origins ==
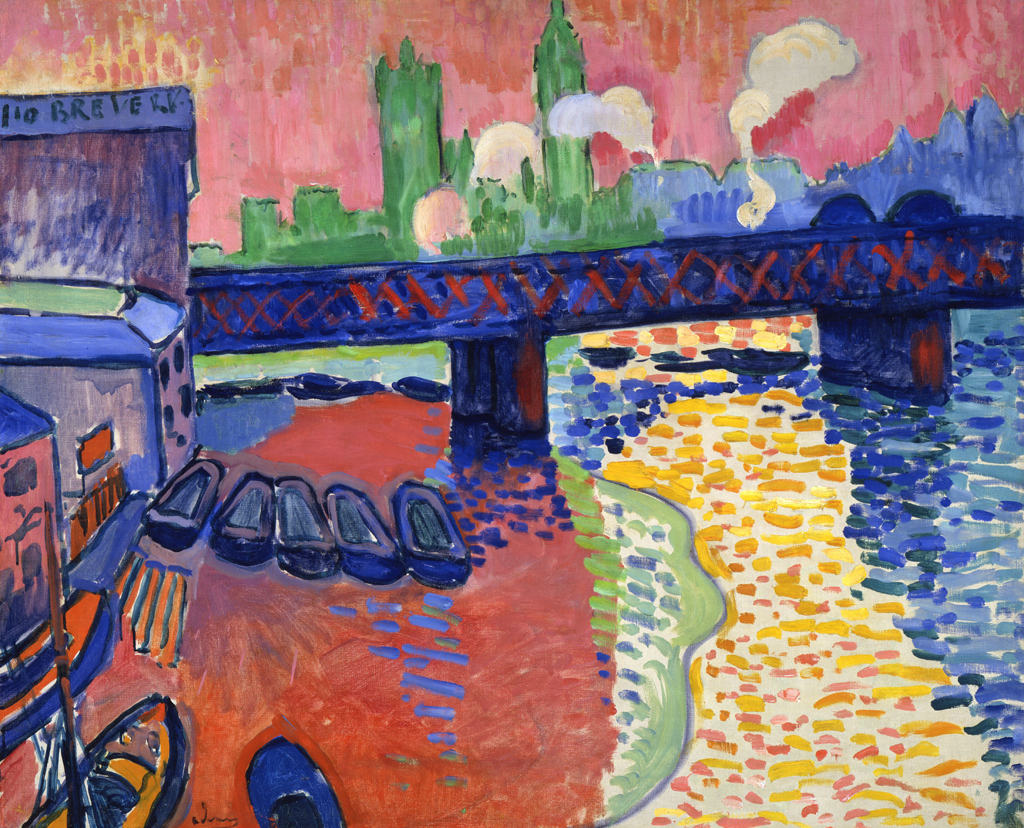
André Derain, 1906, Charing Cross Bridge, London, National Gallery of Art, Washington, D.C.

Gustave Moreau was the movement's inspirational teacher; a controversial professor at the École des Beaux-Arts in Paris and a Symbolist painter, he taught Matisse, Marquet, Manguin, Rouault, and Camoin during the 1890s, and was viewed by critics as the group's philosophical leader until Matisse was recognized as such in 1904. Moreau's broad-mindedness, originality and affirmation of the expressive potency of pure color was inspirational for his students. Matisse said of him, "He did not set us on the right roads, but off the roads. He disturbed our complacency." This source of empathy was taken away with Moreau's death in 1898, but the artists discovered other catalysts for their development.

In 1896, Matisse, then an unknown art student, visited the artist John Russell on the island of Belle Île off the coast of Brittany. Russell was an Impressionist painter; Matisse had never previously seen an Impressionist work directly, and was so shocked at the style that he left after ten days, saying, "I couldn't stand it any more." The next year he returned as Russell's student and abandoned his earth-colored palette for bright Impressionist colors, later stating, "Russell was my teacher, and Russell explained color theory to me." Russell had been a close friend of Vincent van Gogh and gave Matisse a Van Gogh drawing.

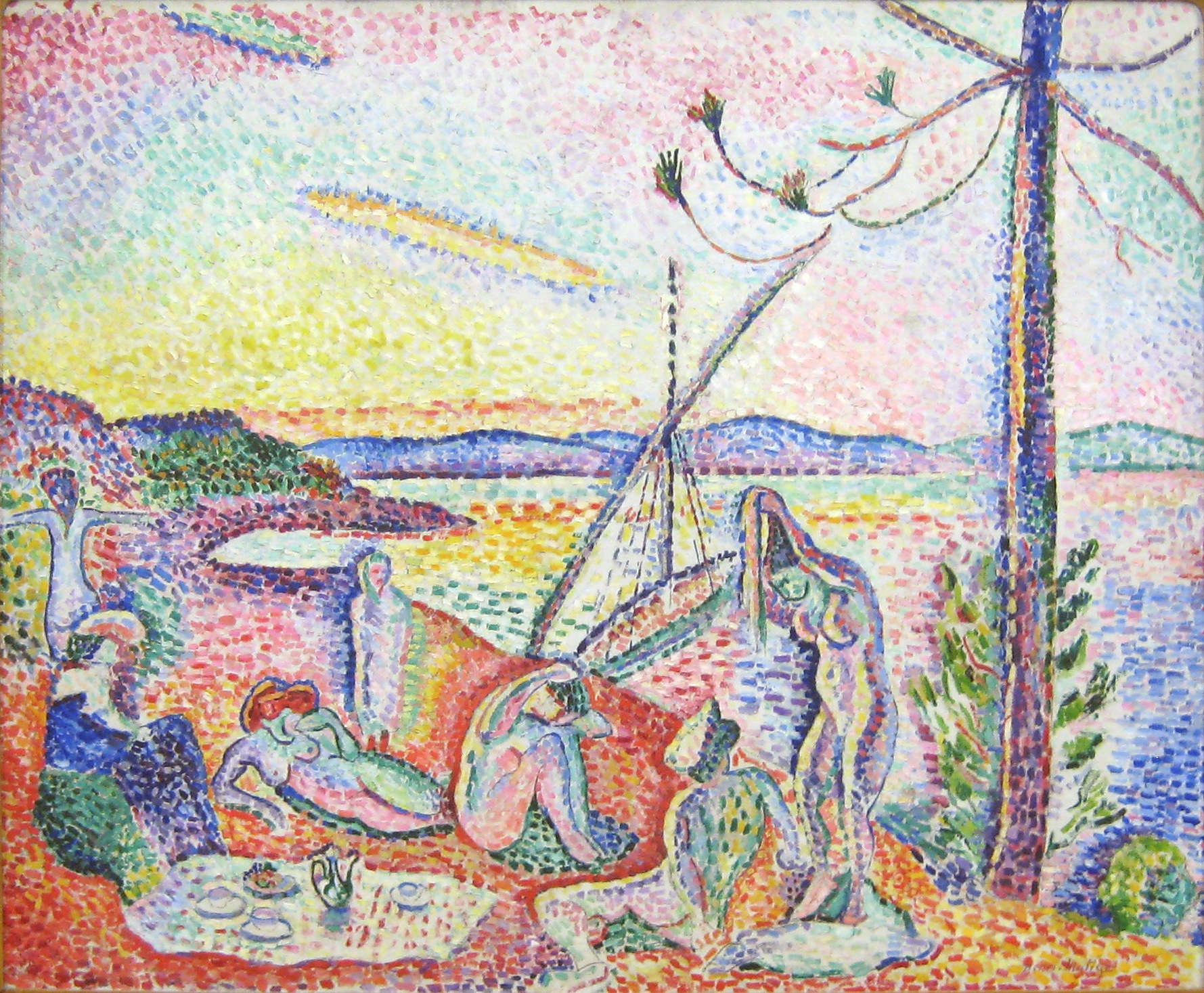
Henri Matisse, Luxe, Calme et Volupté, 1904, oil on canvas, 98 × 118.5 cm, Musée d'Orsay, Paris, France

In 1901, Maurice de Vlaminck encountered the work of Van Gogh for the first time at an exhibition, declaring soon after that he loved Van Gogh more than his own father; he started to work by squeezing paint directly onto the canvas from the tube. In parallel with the artists' discovery of contemporary avant-garde art came an appreciation of pre-Renaissance French art, which was shown in a 1904 exhibition, French Primitives. Another aesthetic influence was African sculpture, of which Vlaminck, Derain and Matisse were early collectors.

Many of the Fauve characteristics first cohered in Matisse's painting, Luxe, Calme et Volupté ("Luxury, Calm and Pleasure"), which he painted in the summer of 1904, while he was in Saint-Tropez with Paul Signac and Henri-Edmond Cross.

Whereas Cézanne and Degas were influenced by the visual experience of railway travel, the Fauves were shaped by the new motorized perception introduced through the act of driving an automobile. Indeed, Matisse painted landscapes in 1917 and 1925 from the perspective of the driver's seat. Derain repeatedly replaced his Bugatti cars over the years, while Vlaminck possessed a sports car and, in his autobiographical novel Dangerous Corner (1929), vividly described the visual experience of driving at a speed of 110 kilometers per hour.

== Salon d'Automne 1905 ==
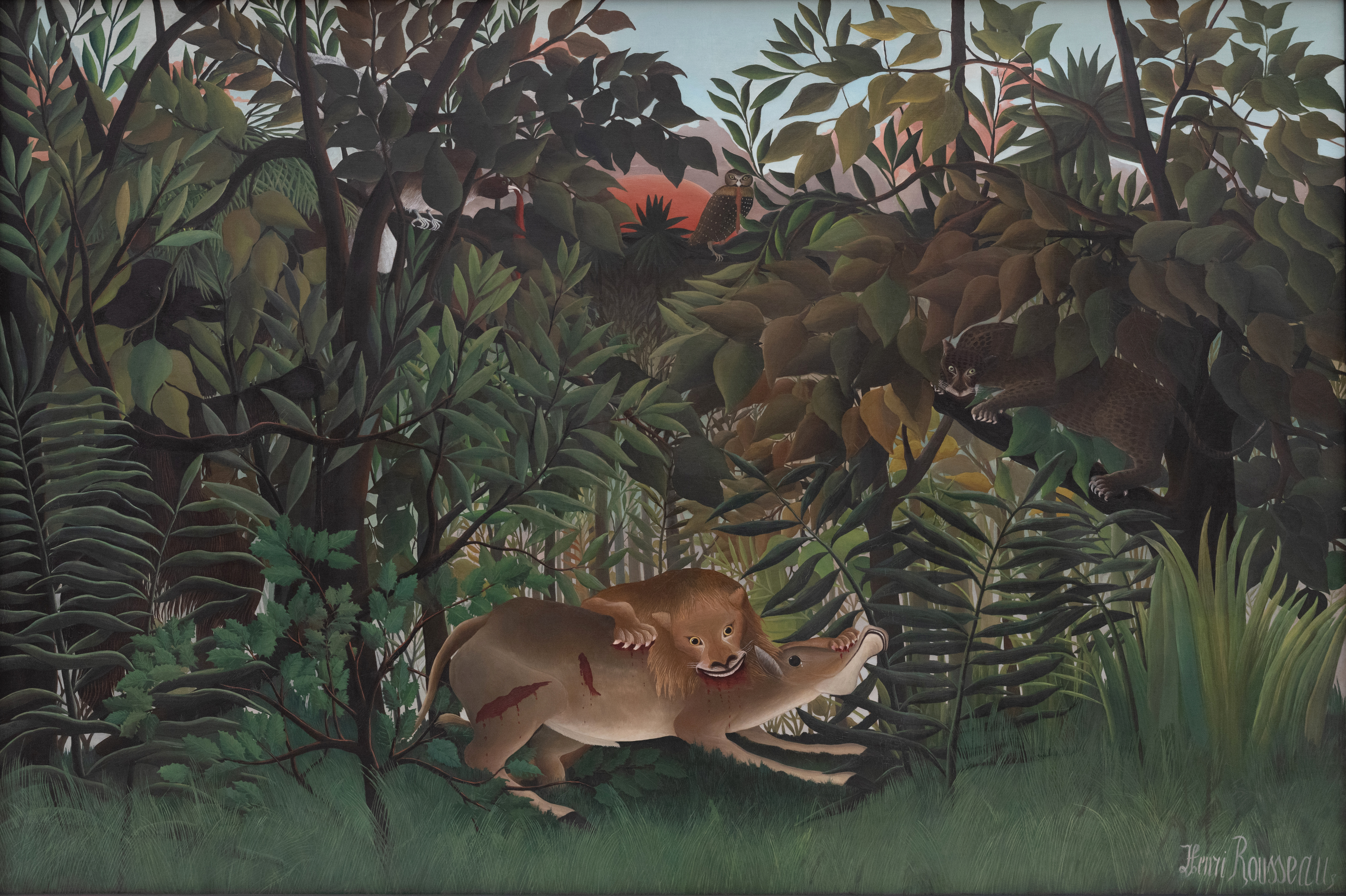
Henri Rousseau, The Hungry Lion Throws Itself on the Antelope, 1905, oil on canvas, 200 cm × 301 cm, Beyeler Foundation, Basel

After viewing the boldly colored canvases of Henri Matisse, André Derain, Albert Marquet, Maurice de Vlaminck, Kees van Dongen, Charles Camoin, Robert Deborne and Jean Puy at the Salon d'Automne of 1905, the critic Louis Vauxcelles disparaged the painters as "fauves" (wild beasts), thus giving their movement the name by which it became known, Fauvism. The artists shared their first exhibition at the 1905 Salon d'Automne. The group gained their name after Vauxcelles described their show of work with the phrase "Donatello chez les fauves" ("Donatello among the wild beasts"), contrasting their "orgy of pure tones" with a Renaissance-style sculpture by Albert Marque that shared the room with them.

Henri Rousseau was not a Fauve, but his large jungle scene The Hungry Lion Throws Itself on the Antelope was exhibited near Matisse's work and may have had an influence on the pejorative used. Vauxcelles' comment was printed on 17 October 1905 in Gil Blas, a daily newspaper, and passed into popular usage. The pictures gained considerable condemnation—"A pot of paint has been flung in the face of the public", wrote the critic Camille Mauclair (1872–1945)—but also some favorable attention. The painting that was singled out for attacks was Matisse's Woman with a Hat; this work's purchase by Gertrude and Leo Stein had a very positive effect on Matisse, who was suffering demoralization from the bad reception of his work. Matisse's Neo-Impressionist landscape, Luxe, Calme et Volupté, had already been exhibited at the Salon des Indépendants in the spring of 1905.

== Salon des Indépendants 1906 ==
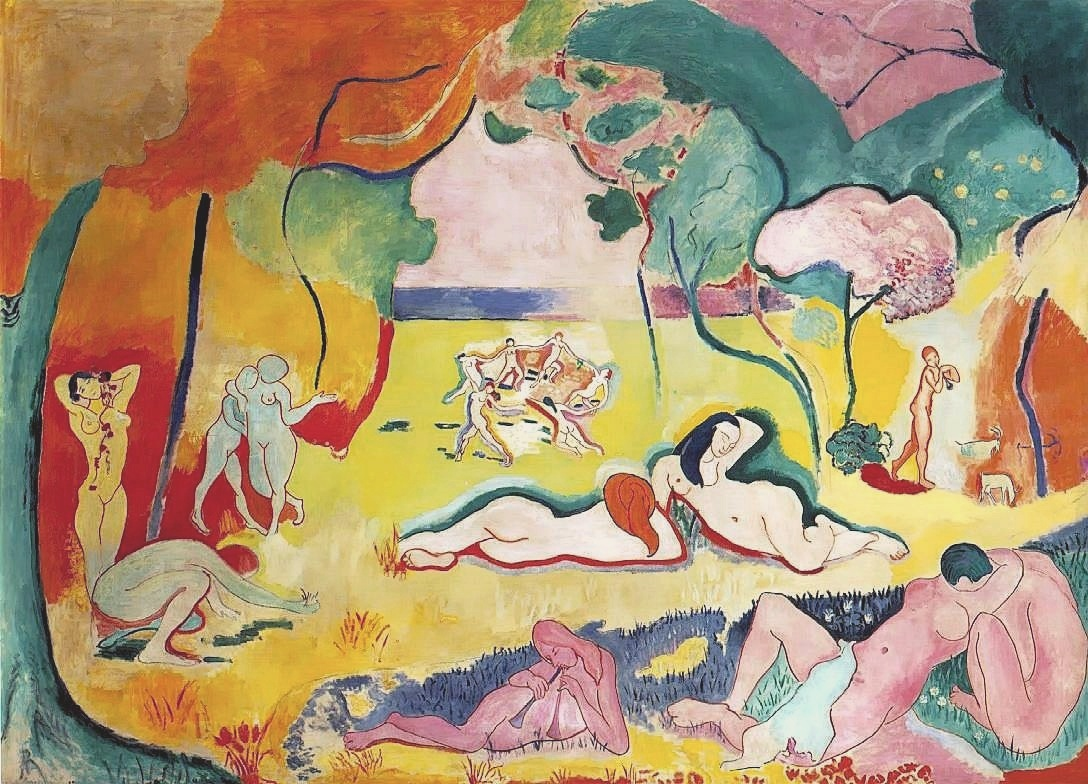
Henri Matisse, Le bonheur de vivre, 1905–06, oil on canvas, 176.5 cm × 240.7 cm, Barnes Foundation, Philadelphia, Pennsylvania

Following the Salon d'Automne of 1905, which marked the beginning of Fauvism, the Salon des Indépendants of 1906 marked the first time all the Fauves would exhibit together. The centerpiece of the exhibition was Matisse's monumental Le Bonheur de Vivre (The Joy of Life). Critics were horrified by its flatness, bright colors, eclectic style and mixed technique. The triangular composition is closely related to Paul Cézanne's Bathers, a series that would soon become a source of inspiration for Picasso's Les Demoiselles d'Avignon.

The elected members of the hanging committee included Matisse, Signac and Metzinger.

== Salon d'Automne 1906 ==
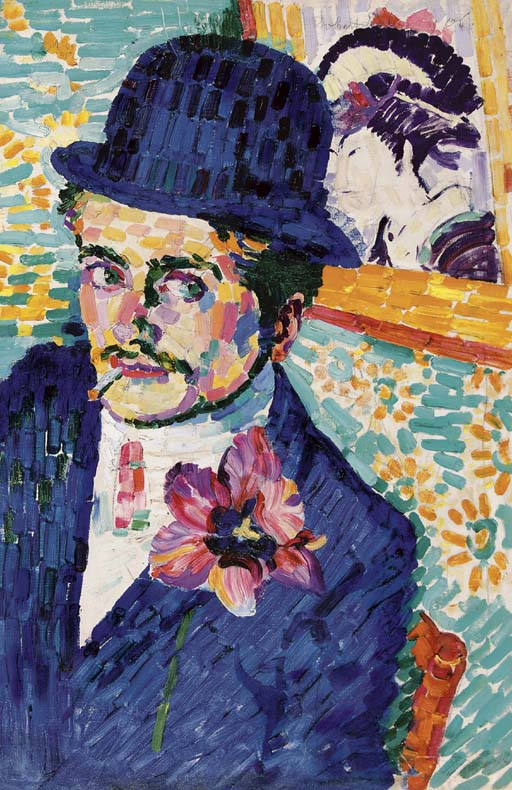
Robert Delaunay, 1906, L'homme à la tulipe (Portrait de Jean Metzinger), oil on canvas, 72.4 x 48.5 cm. Exhibited at the 1906 Salon d'Automne (Paris) along with a portrait of Delaunay by Jean Metzinger

The third group exhibition of the Fauves occurred at the Salon d'Automne of 1906, held from 6 October to 15 November. Metzinger exhibited his Fauvist/Divisionist Portrait of M. Robert Delaunay (no. 1191) and Robert Delaunay exhibited his painting L'homme à la tulipe (Portrait of M. Jean Metzinger) (no. 420 of the catalogue). Matisse exhibited his Liseuse, two still lifes (Tapis rouge and à la statuette), flowers and a landscape (no. 1171–1175). Robert Antoine Pinchon showed his Prairies inondées (Saint-Étienne-du-Rouvray, près de Rouen) (no. 1367), now at the Musée de Louviers, painted in Fauvist style, with golden yellows, incandescent blues, thick impasto and larger brushstrokes.

Paul Cézanne, who died during the show on 22 October, was represented by ten works. His works included Maison dans les arbres (no. 323), Portrait de Femme (no. 235) and Le Chemin tournant (no. 326). Van Dongen showed three works, Montmartre (492), Mademoiselle Léda (493) and Parisienne (494). André Derain exhibited 8 works, Westminster-Londres (438), Arbres dans un chemin creux (444) along with 5 works painted at l'Estaque. Camoin entered 5 works, Dufy 7, Friesz 4, Manguin 6, Marquet 8, Puy 10, Valtat 10, and Vlaminck was represented by 7 works.

== Gallery ==
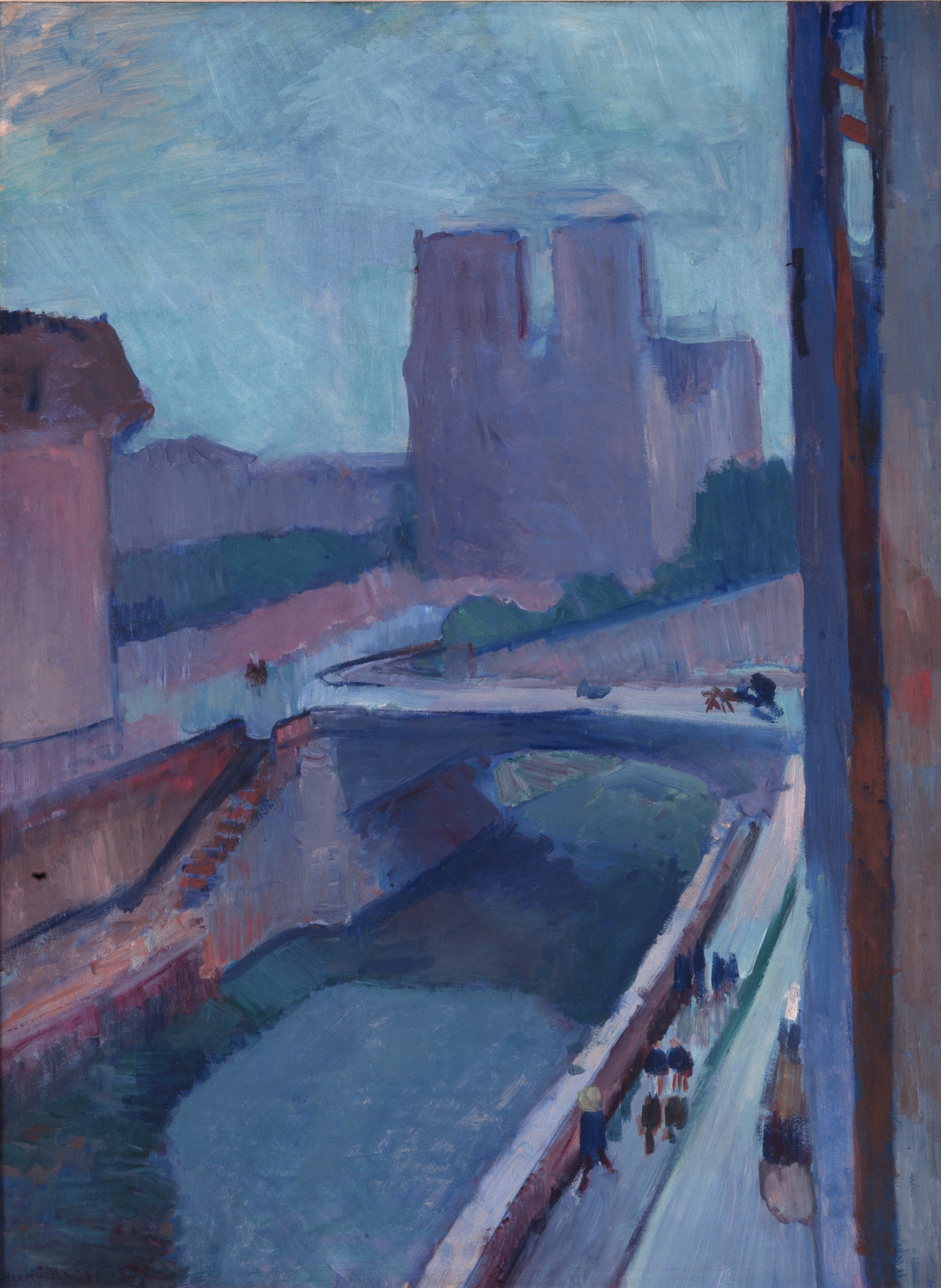
Henri Matisse, Notre-Dame at the end of the Afternoon, 1902, Albright-Knox Art Gallery, Buffalo, New York

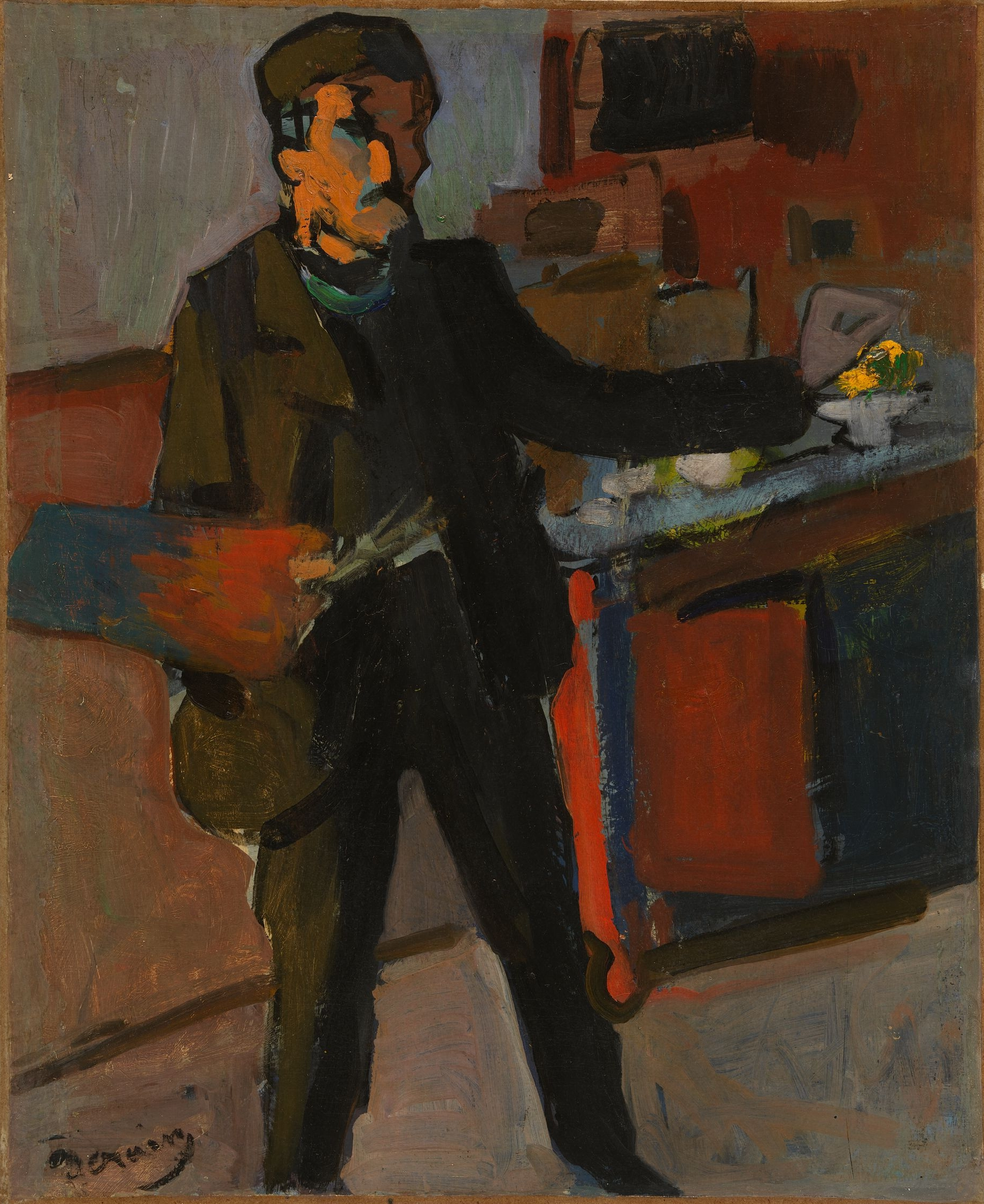
André Derain, Self-portrait in the Studio, 1903, National Gallery of Australia, Canberra, Australia

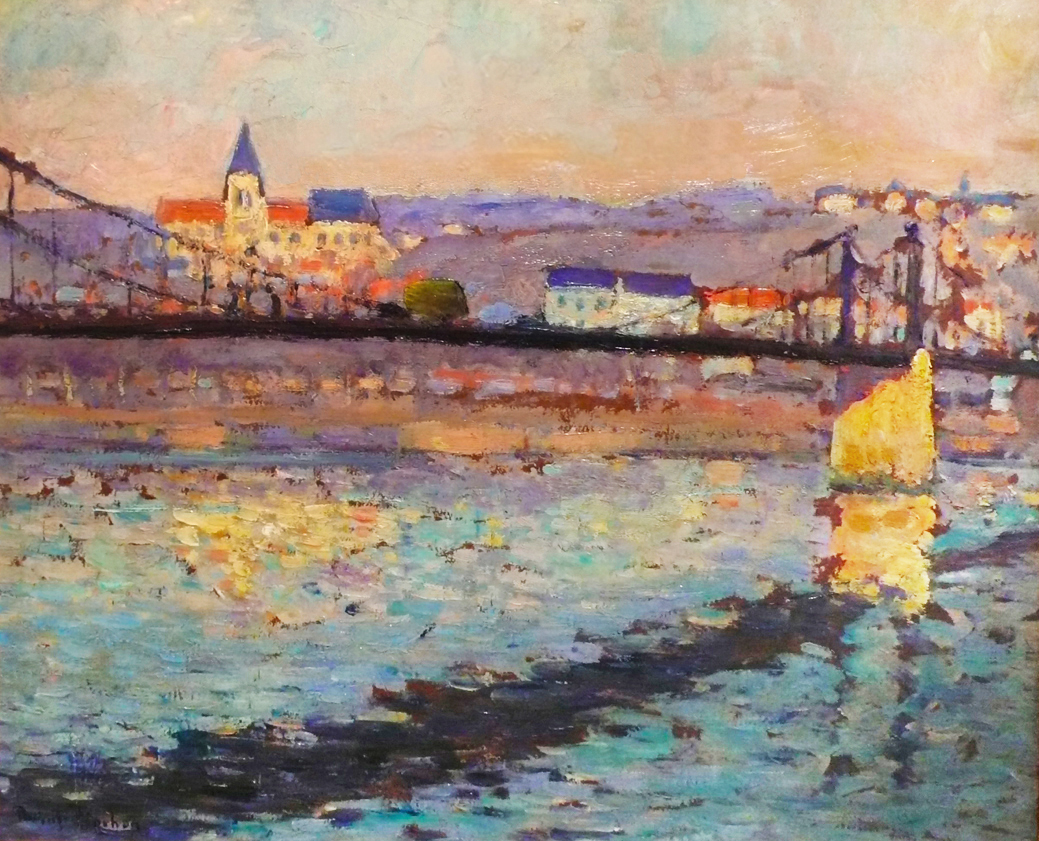
Robert Antoine Pinchon, 1904, Triel sur Seine, le pont du chemin de fer, 46 × 55 cm

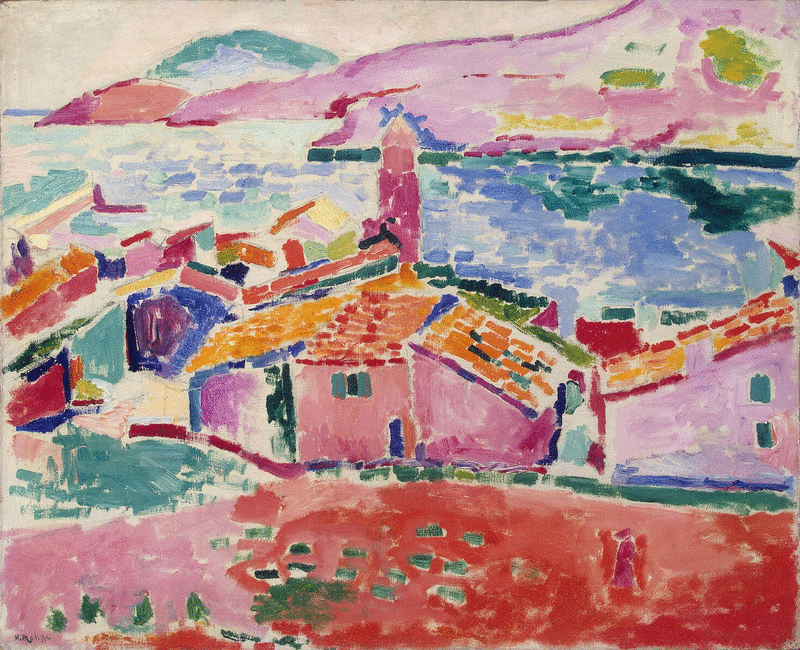
Henri Matisse, Les toits de Collioure, 1905, oil on canvas, The Hermitage, St. Petersburg, Russia

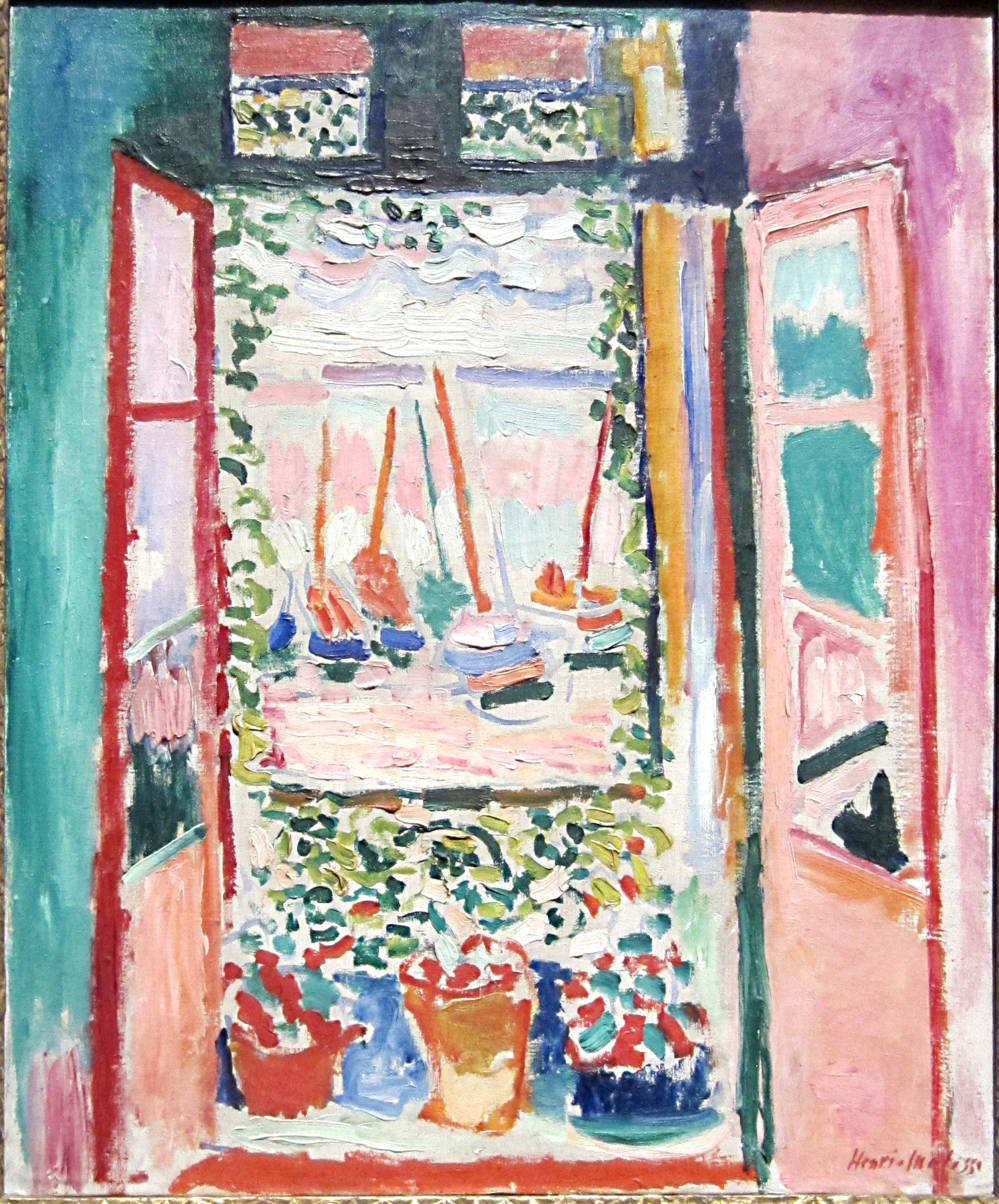
Henri Matisse, Open Window, Collioure, 1905, National Gallery of Art, Washington, DC.

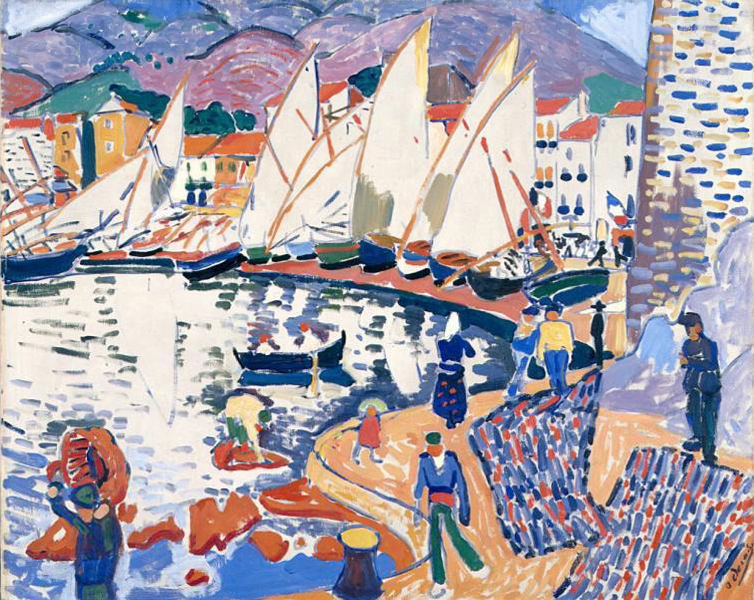
André Derain, 1905, Le séchage des voiles (The Drying Sails), 1905, Pushkin Museum, Moscow

Maurice de Vlaminck, 1905–06, Barges on the Seine (Bateaux sur la Seine), oil on canvas, 81 × 100 cm, Pushkin Museum, Moscow

Georges Braque, 1906, L'Olivier près de l'Estaque (The Olive tree near l'Estaque). At least four versions of this scene were painted by Braque, one of which was stolen from the Musée d'Art Moderne de la Ville de Paris during the month of May 2010.

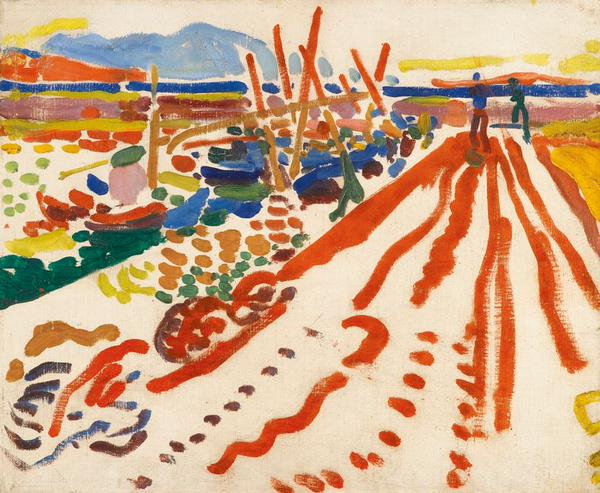
André Derain, La jetée à L'Estaque, 1906, oil on canvas, 38 × 46 cm

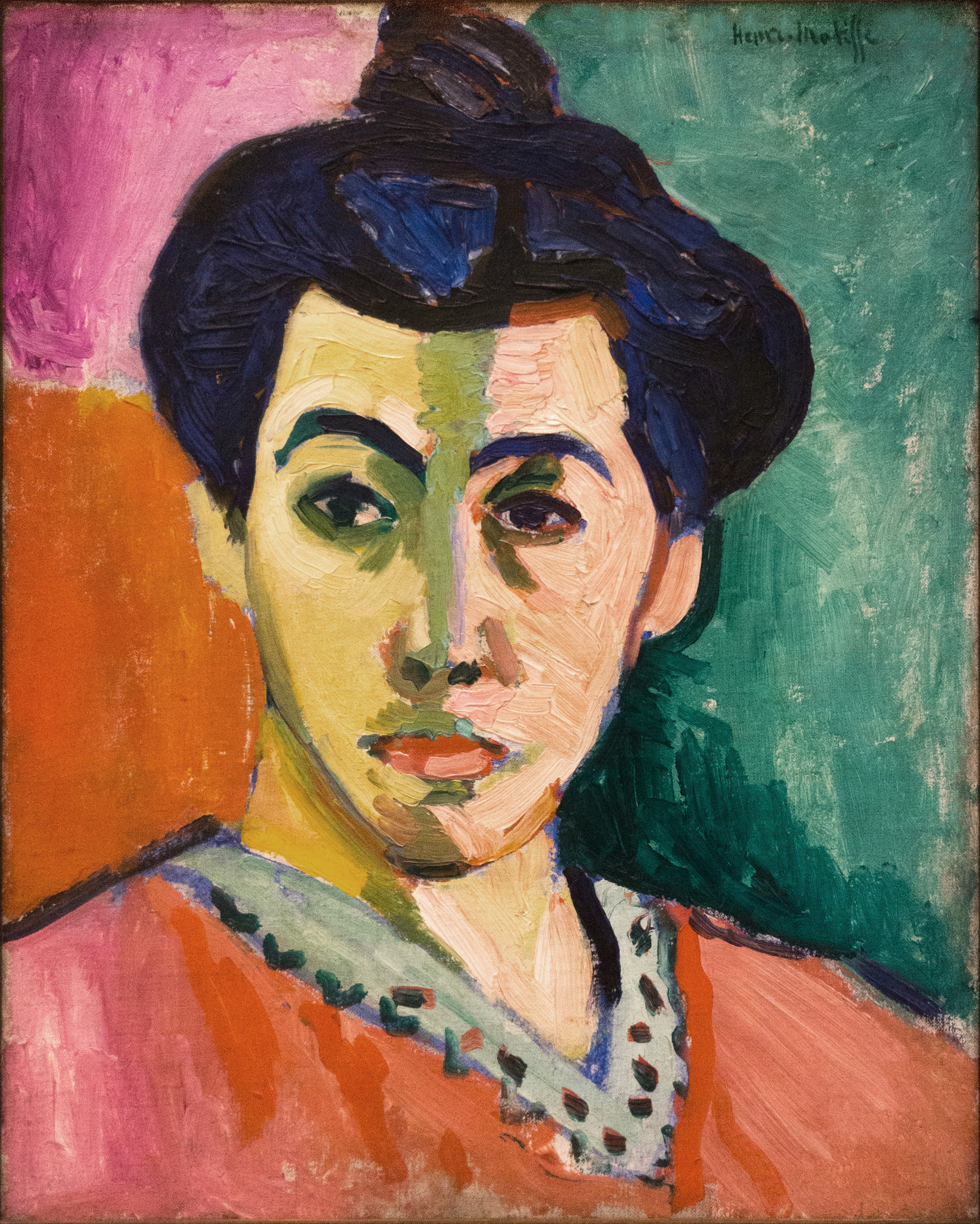
Henri Matisse, Portrait of Madame Matisse (The Green Stripe) 1906, Statens Museum for Kunst, Copenhagen, Denmark

Maurice de Vlaminck, The River Seine at Chatou, 1906, Metropolitan Museum of Art

Kees van Dongen, Woman with Large Hat, 1906

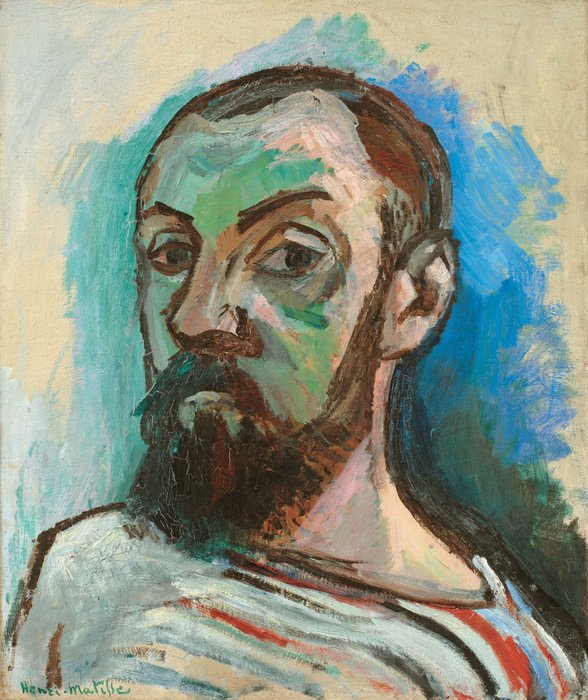
Henri Matisse, 1906, Self-Portrait in a Striped T-shirt, Statens Museum for Kunst, Copenhagen, Denmark

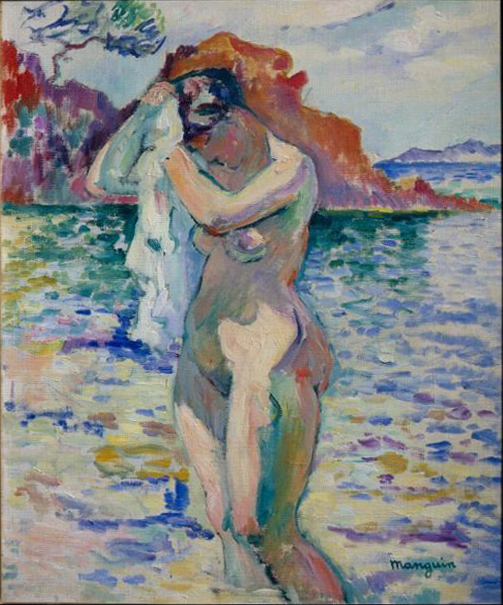
Henri Manguin, 1906, Baigneuse (Woman Bather), oil on canvas, Pushkin Museum, Moscow

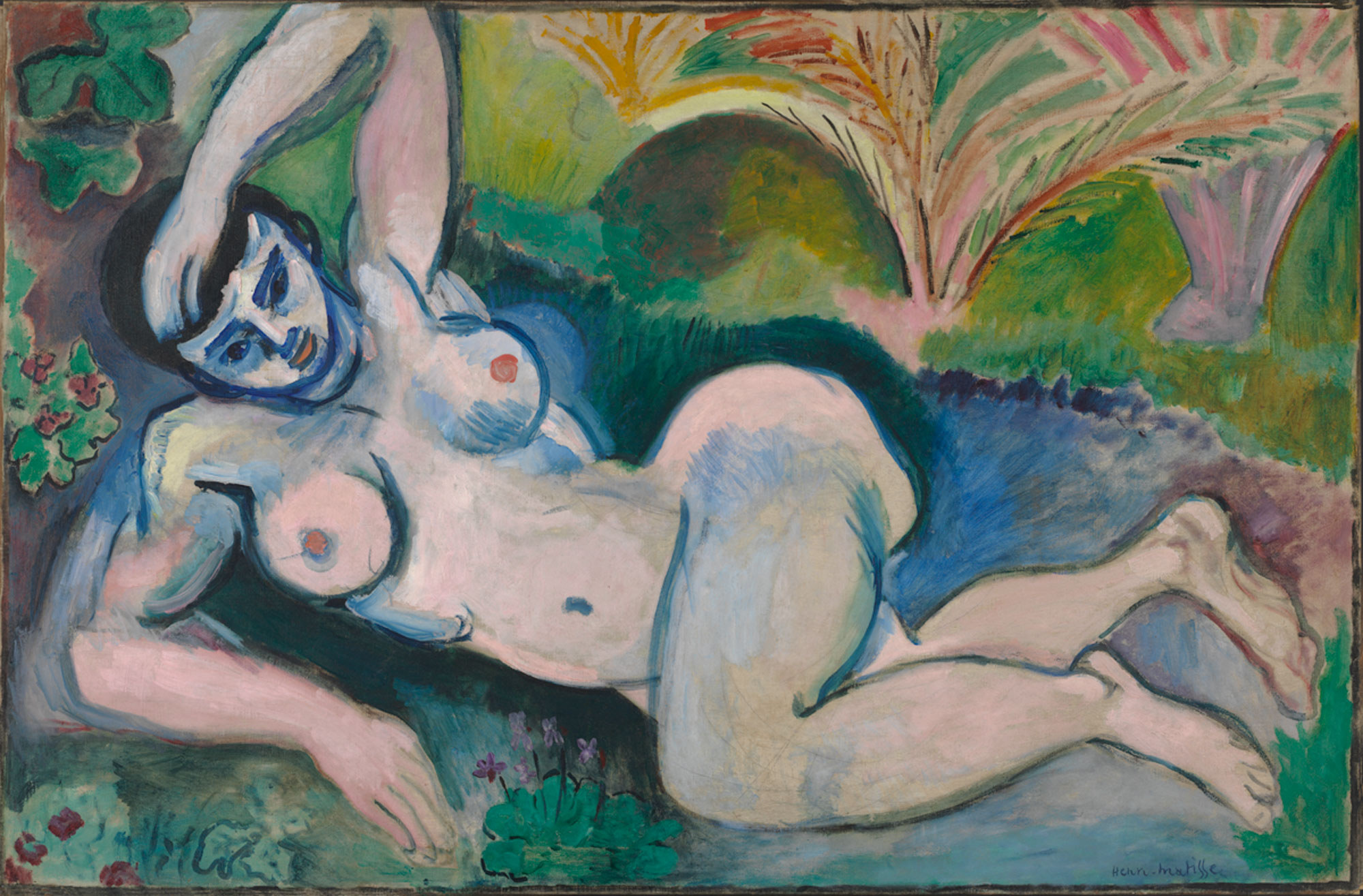
Henri Matisse, 1907, Blue Nude (Souvenir of Biskra), Baltimore Museum of Art

Jean Metzinger, 1907, Paysage coloré aux oiseaux aquatiques, oil on canvas, 74 × 99 cm, Musée d'Art Moderne de la Ville de Paris

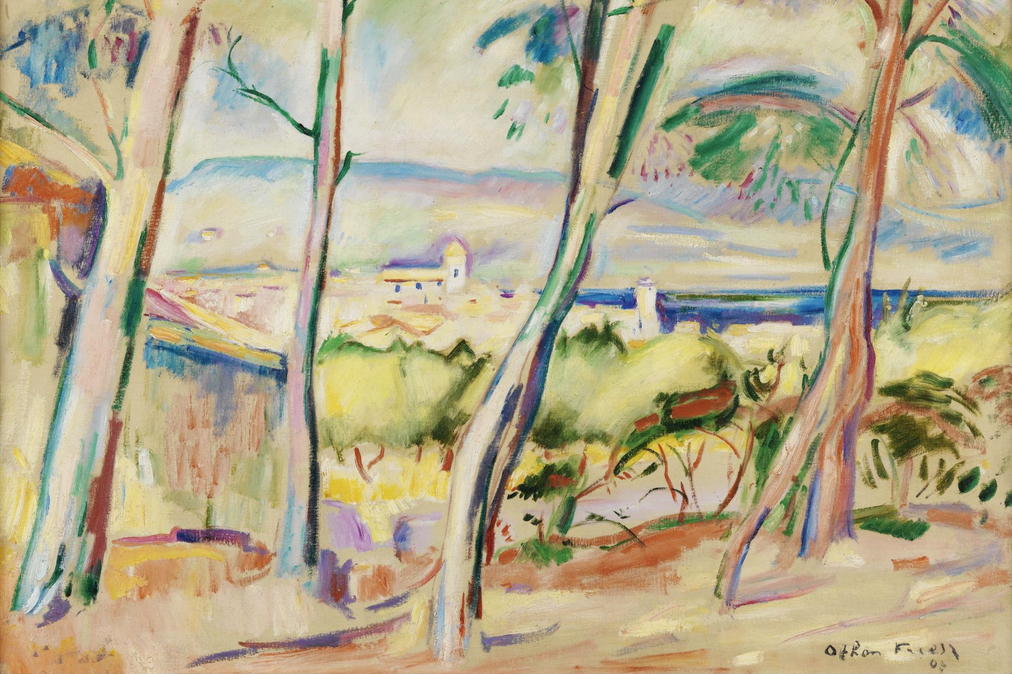
Othon Friesz, 1907, Paysage à La Ciotat, oil on canvas, 59.9 × 72.9 cm

Henri Matisse, The Dessert: Harmony in Red (The Red Room), 1908, Hermitage Museum, St. Petersburg, Russia

== See also ==
- Art history
- History of painting
- Neo-Fauvism
- Visual arts
- Western painting
- Expressionism
