= Neo-Fauvism =

Poetic style of painting

Neo-Fauvism was a poetic style of French painting from the mid-1920s proposed as a challenge to Surrealism.

The magazine Cahiers d'Art was launched in 1926 and its writers mounted a challenge to the Surrealist practice of automatism by seeing it not in terms of unconscious expression, but as another development of traditional artistry. They identified a group of artists as the exponents of this and termed them Neo-Fauves.

Although these artists were later mostly forgotten, the movement had an effect of disillusioning the Surrealist group with the technique of graphic automatism as a revolutionary means of by-passing conventional aesthetics, ideology and commercialism.

Neo-Fauvism has been seen as the last trend within painting that could be marketed as a coherent style.

== See also ==
- Art history
- Visual Arts and Design
- History of Painting
- Western painting
- Fauvism
