= Villa Stein =

House by Le Corbusier in Vaucresson, France

Coordinates: 48°50′49″N 2°10′37″E

Villa Stein

Villa Stein is a building designed by Le Corbusier between 1926 and 1928 at Vaucresson, France. The building is also known as Villa Garches, Villa de Monzie, and Villa Stein-de Monzie.

Located at 17 rue du professeur Victor Pauchet, the villa was built for Gabrielle Colaco-Osorio de Monzie (1882–1961) and Sarah Stein, sister-in-law of American writer Gertrude Stein, between 1926 and 1928.
