= Woman with a Hat =

Painting by Henri Matisse

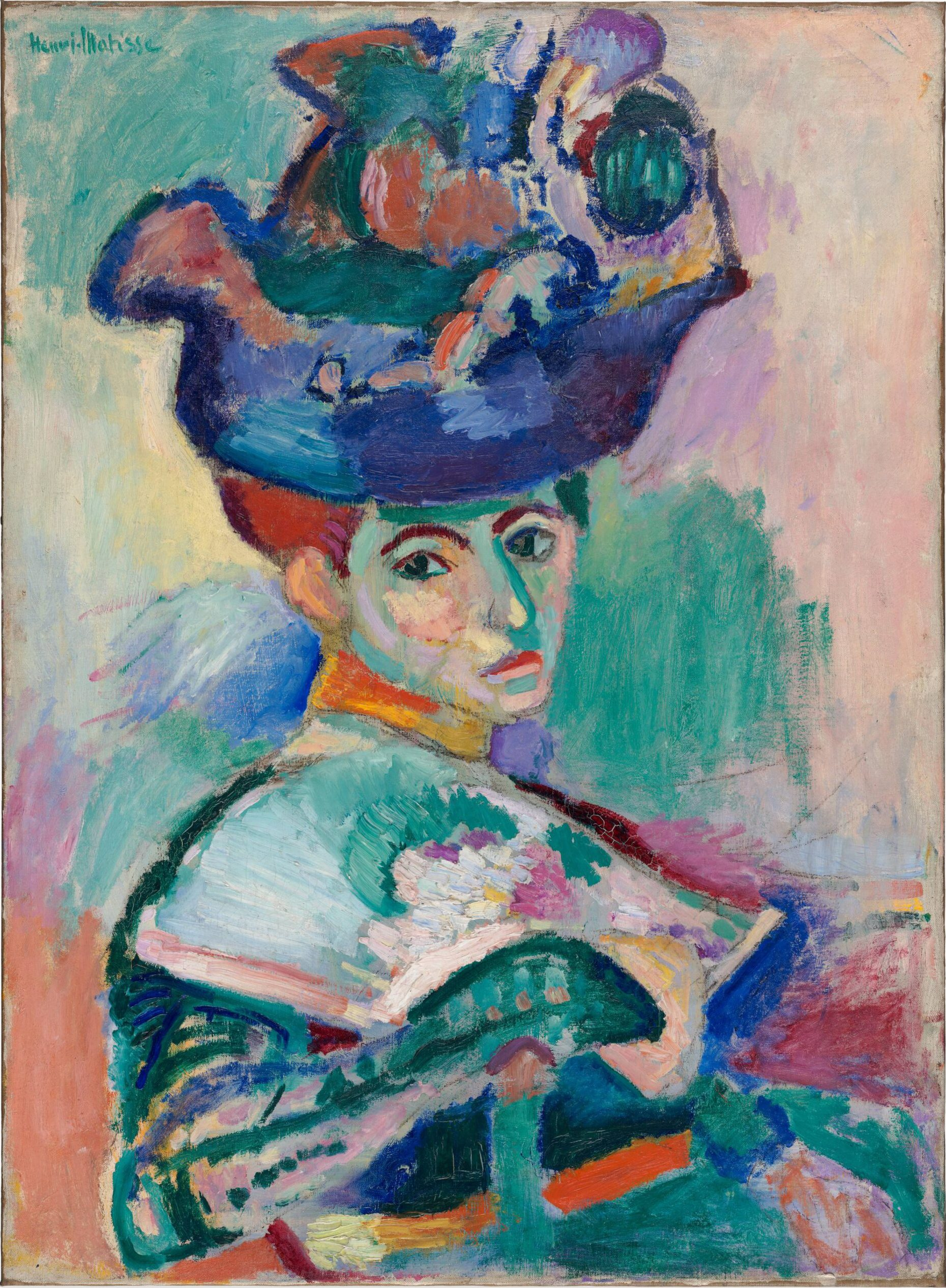
- Artist: Henri Matisse
- Year: 1905
- Medium: Oil on canvas
- Movement: Fauvism
- Dimensions: 80.65 cm × 59.69 cm (31 3/4 in × 23 1/2 in)
- Location: San Francisco Museum of Modern Art, San Francisco

Woman with a Hat (French: La femme au chapeau) is an oil-on-canvas painting by Henri Matisse. It depicts Matisse's wife, Amélie Matisse. It was painted in 1905 and exhibited at the Salon d'Automne during the autumn of the same year, along with works by André Derain, Maurice de Vlaminck and several other artists later known as "Fauves".

Critic Louis Vauxcelles, in comparing the paintings of Matisse and his associates with a Renaissance-type sculpture displayed alongside them, used the phrase "Donatello chez les fauves..." (Donatello among the wild beasts). Woman with a Hat was at the center of this controversy, marking a stylistic shift in the work of Matisse from the Divisionist brushstrokes of his earlier work to a more expressive style. Its loose brushwork and "unfinished" quality shocked viewers as much as its vivid, non-naturalistic colors.

== Description ==
The painting is a seated, half-length portrait of Amélie Matisse. The size, format, pose, and costume suggest a society portrait but distinctly depart from earlier painting styles. In the work, bold, unnatural colors and swirling brushstrokes make up the woman's face. Matisse's use of vibrant color to represent light and shadow is evident in the green line separating the face. These brushstrokes and colors define the piece, directing the viewer's attention to details such as the gloved hand and ornate fan. Additionally, the imaginative hat marks a complete departure from painting as a reflection of reality. Finally, the background of the painting appears largely ambiguous, making it difficult to determine the position of the chair or the setting in which this painting was completed.

== Rise of Fauvism ==
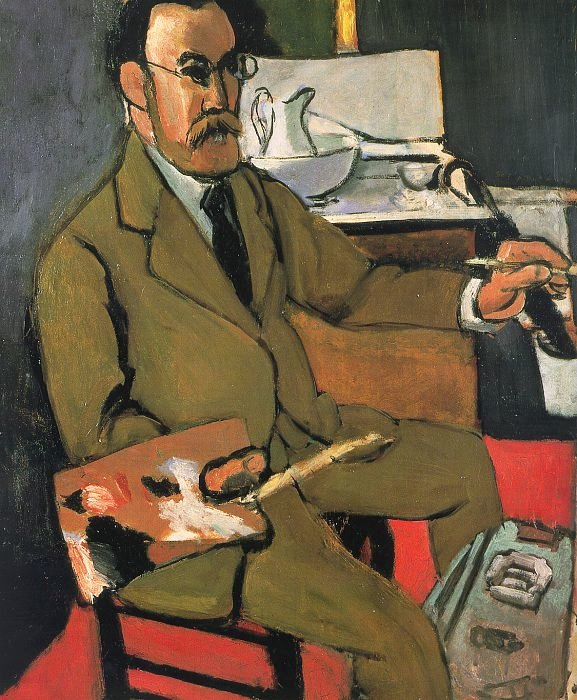
Henri Matisse, 1918 Self-Portrait. Oil on canvas.

Matisse surprised Paris society with the exhibition of this portrait at the 1905 Salon d'Automne. He began painting the piece in September and completed it before the salon in October. It was created as part of a larger series he worked on in the south of France from May to September 1905. During this time, André Derain, a fellow painter integral to the Fauvist movement, joined him at his home in Collioure. The two aimed to treat color as a "material" like other solids such as stone or wood. This goal inspired the Woman with a Hat, departing from previous painting techniques and demonstrating a shift in the French art world known as Fauvism.

In the painting itself, Matisse began with a roughly sketched outline, filling the work with contrasting strokes of color rather than defined shapes. This style represents a distinct change from his earlier Neo-Impressionist paintings. For the first time, Matisse departed from a single technique. Instead, he adopted a multi-technique style, which, according to the scholar John Elderfield, demonstrates "how he was questioning the foundations of Impressionism from which he had emerged." Thus, Fauvism was born from the techniques used in Woman with A Hat.

== Scandal ==
The painting's unusual techniques were not immediately met with praise. Of all the entries to the salon, Woman with the Hat drew the largest audience, though most of the attention was not positive. According to John Klein, the "bright palette and loose, seemingly haphazard application" drew the most unfavorable attention. The piece was deemed infantile, dismissed as madness by audience members and the media alike.

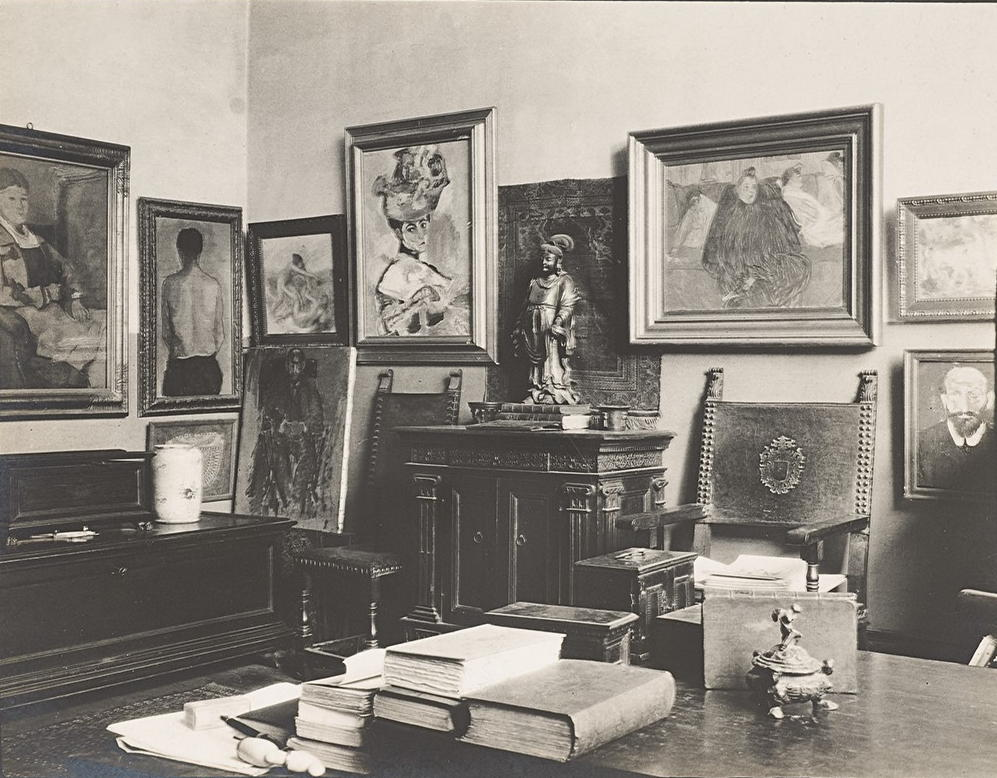
The apartment of Leo and Gertrude Stein at 27 rue de Fleurus, Paris, c. 1906, with Femme au Chapeau on the wall.

Fauvism elicited this response for many of its early viewers. However, Matisse and others continued in this new technique, exhibiting together for the first time at the Salon des Indépendants in 1906. The centerpiece of this exhibit was another work by Matisse, Le Bonheur de Vivre (The Joy of Life), demonstrating his central role in the beginning of this movement.

When recalling the polarizing reception of the artwork, Amélie Matisse is quoted as saying, "I am in my element when the house burns down."

The exhibit (and companion book) Matisse's Femme au chapeau: A Modern Scandal, at the San Francisco Museum of Modern Art 16 May–13 September 2026, recreates the experience of the visitors and critics who first encountered Femme au chapeau (Woman with a Hat) at the Salon d'Automne in 1905.

== Ownership ==
The siblings Gertrude and Leo Stein were two Americans who brought their modern views of painting to the French salon. Countering French conservative taste, they were among the first admirers of Matisse's new work. In The Autobiography of Alice B. Toklas, Stein wrote of their visit to the 1905 Salon d'Automne,

The show had a great deal of freshness and was not alarming. There were a number of attractive pictures but there was one that was not attractive. It infuriated the public, they tried to scratch off the paint. Gertrude Stein liked that picture, it was a portrait of a woman with a long face and a fan. It was very strange in its colour and in its anatomy. She said she wanted to buy it.

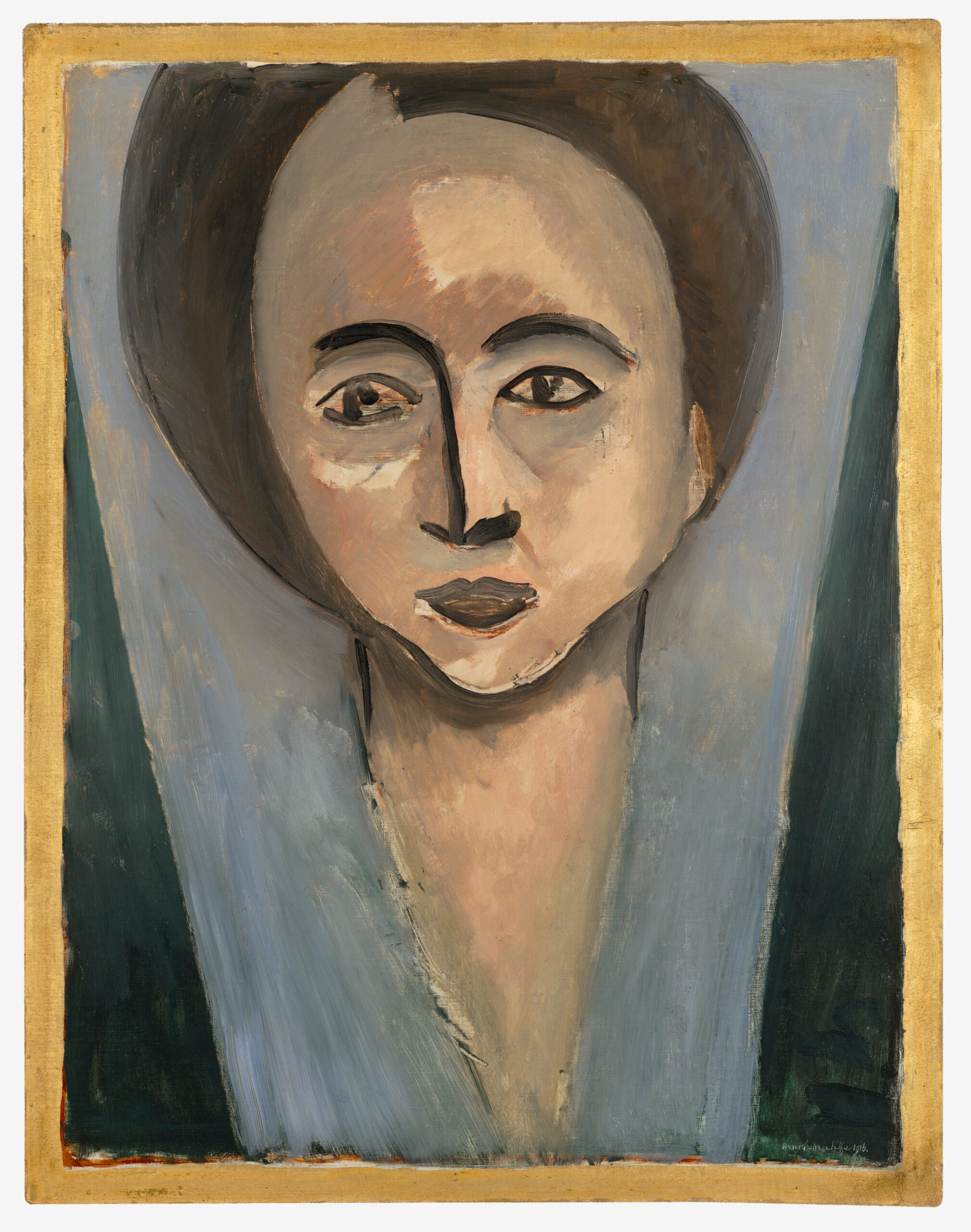
Matisse's Portrait de Sarah Stein, 1916.

The Steins bought the controversial Woman with a Hat for 500 francs, boosting Matisse's morale after the initial harsh criticism of his work. The purchase was a seminal moment in the careers of both Gertrude Stein and Henri Matisse.

Ownership later passed to Michael and Sarah Stein, who sold the painting in 1948 to Levi Strauss heiress Elise S. Haas, who in 1990 bequeathed Woman with a Hat and thirty-six other works of art to the San Francisco Museum of Modern Art, where the painting remains today.

== See also ==
- List of works by Henri Matisse
- Femme au Chapeau by Jean Metzinger
- Salon d'Automne
- Fauvism
