= List of fellows of the British Academy elected in the 1990s =

The Fellowship of the British Academy consists of world-leading scholars and researchers in the humanities and social sciences. A number of fellows are elected each year in July at the Academy's annual general meeting.

== 1999 ==
The following fellows of the British Academy were elected at the annual general meeting in 1999:

- Professor W. G. Arnott (formerly University of Leeds), Classics
- Professor G. W. W. Barker (University of Leicester), Archaeology
- Professor A. J. Bate (University of Liverpool), English Literature
- Professor J. S. Bell (University of Leeds), Law
- Professor R. A. Brealey (Bank of England), Economics
- Professor R. Breen (Queen's University Belfast on leave at European University Institute), Sociology
- Professor V. G. Bruce (University of Stirling), Psychology
- Professor D. N. Cannadine (Institute of Historical Research, University of London), History
- Dr M. T. Clanchy (University of London), History
- Professor I. Clark (University of Wales, Aberystwyth), International History
- Professor L. J. Colley (London School of Economics and Political Science), History
- Professor K. J. Gray (University of Cambridge), Law
- Professor C. K. Green (Courtauld Institute of Art, University of London), History of Art
- Professor C. R. Harlow (London School of Economics and Political Science), Law
- Professor A. C. Harvey (University of Cambridge), Econometrics
- Dr G. Herrmann (University College London), Archaeology
- Professor J. Higgins (University of Liverpool), Latin American Literature
- Professor M. E. Hobson (Queen Mary and Westfield College, University of London), French Studies
- Dr A. B. Hunt (University of Oxford), French Literature
- Professor W. R. James (University of Oxford), Social Anthropology
- Professor R. J. Johnston (University of Bristol), Geography
- Professor P. D. Klemperer (University of Oxford), Economics
- Dr V. A. Law (University of Cambridge), History of Linguistics
- Dr M. C. McKendrick (University of Cambridge), Hispanic Studies
- Dr R. I. McKibbin (University of Oxford), History
- Professor W. F. Madelung (University of Oxford), Arabic
- Professor I. Markova (University of Stirling), Psychology
- Professor J. H. Hardman Moore (London School of Economics and Political Science; University of St Andrews), Economics
- Professor T. O'Riordan (University of East Anglia), Environmental Sciences
- Professor J. B. Paris (University of Manchester), Mathematical Logic
- Professor J. T. Reason (University of Manchester), Psychology
- Professor N. V. Smith (University College London), Linguistics
- Professor H. I. Steiner (University of Manchester), Political Studies
- Professor M. W. Swales (University College London), German Literature

== 1998 ==
The following fellows of the British Academy were elected at the annual general meeting in 1998:

- Professor S. Bann. (University of Kent), Modern Cultural Studies
- Professor E. V. Barker. (London School of Economics), Sociology
- Mr N. J. Barker. (formerly British Library), Bibliography
- Professor R. J. Bauckham. (University of St Andrews), Theology
- Dr P. A. Brand. (University of Oxford), Law
- Professor W. H. Buiter. (University of Cambridge), Economics
- Dr C. S. F. Burnett. (Warburg Institute, University of London), History
- Professor B. Buzan. (University of Westminster), Political Studies
- Professor P. P. Craig. (University of Oxford), Law
- Professor W. Doyle. (University of Bristol), History
- Professor R. I. M. Dunbar. (University of Liverpool), Psychology
- Professor P. E. Easterling. (University of Cambridge), Classics
- Professor P. K. Edwards. (University of Warwick), Sociology
- Professor G. Hammond. (University of Manchester), Literature
- Dr P. Harris. (University of Oxford), Psychology
- Dr C. Humphrey. (University of Cambridge), Social Anthropology
- Dr G. A. Khan. (University of Cambridge), Semitic studies
- Professor A. S. Knight. (University of Oxford), History
- Dr E. McGrath. (Warburg Institute, University of London), Art History
- Professor D. I. Marquand. (University of Oxford), Political Studies
- Professor J. A. Moss. (University of Durham), French Studies
- Professor R. C. T. Parker. (University of Oxford), Ancient History
- Professor M. H. Pesaran. (University of Cambridge), Economics
- Professor P. H. Rees. (University of Leeds), Geography
- Professor R. M. Sainsbury. (King's College, London), Philosophy
- Professor R. J. Service. (School of Slavonic and East European Studies, London), History
- Professor G. Steiner. (University of Cambridge), Literature
- Professor J. S. Vickers. (University of Oxford), Economics
- Professor A. P. Weale. (University of Essex), Political Studies
- Professor A. Whittle. (University of Wales, Cardiff), Archaeology
- Professor C. J. Wickham. (University of Birmingham), History

=== Senior fellows ===
- Dr M. Gelling. (University of Birmingham), Philology and Place-name Studies
- Mrs I. M. B. Opie. Social History

== 1997 ==
The following fellows of the British Academy were elected at the annual general meeting in 1997:

- Professor R. J. Bartlett
- Professor R. W. Blundell
- Professor V. B. Bogdanor
- Professor A. E. Bottoms
- Professor H. D. Clout
- Professor S. Cohen
- Professor G. G. Corbett
- Professor M. J. Daunton
- Professor I. N. R. Davies
- Professor K. H. F. Dyson
- Dr D. N. Fallows
- Professor D. P. Farrington
- Professor P. Fonagy
- Dr B. J. Heal
- Professor B. G. Hewitt
- R. G. H. Holmes
- Rev. Dr W. Horbury
- Professor T. Ingold
- Professor J. A. Kay
- Professor B. S. Markesinis
- Dr J. N. J. Muellbauer
- Professor A. D. Nuttall
- Professor N. F. Palmer
- Dr M. Schofield
- Professor I. G. Simmons
- Professor A. Stepan
- Professor W. L. Twinning
- Professor P. M. Warren
- Professor T. Williamson
- Professor A. B. Worden

=== Senior Fellow ===
- Professor B. Tizard

== 1996 ==
The following fellows of the British Academy were elected at the annual general meeting in 1996:

- Professor J. D. Ades
- Dr J. Bergin
- Dr J. N. Butterfield
- Professor J. Carey
- Professor N. L. D. Cartwright
- Dr A. D. Cliff
- Professor J. F. Dunn
- Professor R. H. Finnegan
- Dr R. Foot
- Professor H. Goldstein
- Dr M. D. Goodman
- Dr I. R. Hodder
- Professor C. C. Hood
- Professor A. G. Hopkins
- Dr J. R. L. Maddicott
- Professor W. D. Marslen-Wilson
- The Lord Mustill
- Professor J. L. Nelson
- Professor B. J. Pimlott
- Dr C. A. J. Prendergast
- Dr A. Pyman
- Professor N. G. Round
- Professor P. Sims-Williams
- Professor R. Sugden
- Professor J. Sutton
- Professor M. W. Thomas
- Dr D. J. Thompson
- Professor J. C. Wells
- Dr K. E. Wrightson
- Dr J. Wymer

=== Senior fellows ===
- Professor D. K. Fieldhouse
- Professor D. N. MacKenzie

== 1995 ==
The following fellows of the British Academy were elected at the annual general meeting in 1995:

- Professor K. G. Binmore
- Dr D. A. Brading
- Professor R. J. Bradley
- Professor M. J. Budd
- Dr P. A. David
- Professor C. C. Dyer
- Professor J. F. Ermisch
- Professor L. D. Freedman
- Dr J. S. Gage
- Dr D. I. D. Gallie
- Dr A. A. F. Gell
- Professor J. T. Higginbotham
- Dame Rosalyn Higgins
- Dr J. T. Killen
- Professor D. N. Livingstone
- Dr D. J. McKitterick
- Professor S. E. Marks
- Dr J. S. Morrill
- A. Murray
- Professor B. A. Rudden
- Dr E. S. Shaffer
- Dr K. Sparck Jones
- Professor H. M. Spufford
- Dr O. P. Taplin
- C. C. Taylor
- Professor R. W. Thomson
- Professor L. Tyler
- Professor J. R. Woodhouse
- Dr V. Wright
- Dr T. Zeldin

=== Senior fellows ===
- Professor M. A. E. Drummett
- Professor A. H. Halsey
- Professor R. B. Wernham

== 1994 ==
The following fellows of the British Academy were elected at the annual general meeting in 1994:

- Dr M. E. Aston
- Dr C. P. Bammel
- Professor J. B. Beer
- Dr A. K. Bowman
- P. Burke
- I. Christie
- L. A. Collins
- Professor T. M. Devine
- Professor M. Frede
- Professor M. G. Fulford
- Dr J. H. Golding
- Professor A. G. Hill
- Professor R. M. Hogg
- Professor M. Lapidge
- Professor B. J. Loasby
- Dr I. W. F. Maclean
- Professor D. L. McMullen
- Professor W. L. Miller
- Professor R. Porter
- Professor P. Preston
- Professor C. Scott
- Dr D. N. Sedley
- Professor Lord Skidelsky
- Dr P. Spufford
- Dr R. Tuck
- Professor K. F. Wallis
- Professor A. G. Wilson
- Dr B. R. Wilson

=== Senior fellows ===
- Professor J. T. Boulton
- Dr D. E. Butler
- Dr M. B. Hall
- Professor W. R. Mead
- Professor S. Reckert

== 1993 ==
The following fellows of the British Academy were elected at the annual general meeting in 1993:

- Professor A. J. Ashworth
- Dr P. Beal
- Dr M. Bent
- Professor J. A. Bossy
- Professor M. M. Bowie
- Dr R. Cooper
- Dr E. J. Craig
- Professor C. I. E. Donaldson
- Professor R. J. Evans
- Dr P. D. A. Garnsey
- Professor R. Gray
- Professor A. G. Guest
- Dr J. F. Harris
- J. D. Hawkins
- Professor G. A. Hosking
- Professor R. M. Jones
- Professor A. Karmiloff-Smith
- Professor P. Langford
- Professor D. M. MacDowell
- Professor M. M. McGowan
- Professor A. F. McPherson
- Professor S. J. Nickell
- Dr O. O'Neill
- Dr M. B. Parkes
- Professor D. J. Parkin
- J. N. Postgate
- S. M. G. Reynolds
- Professor A. S. Skinner
- Professor N. Stern
- Professor R. Strohm
- Professor H. G. M. Williamson

=== Senior fellows ===
- Professor R. M. Hatton
- Professor I. G. Kidd
- Professor A. C. Lloyd
- Professor R. A. Oliver
- G. Reynolds

== 1992 ==
The following fellows of the British Academy were elected at the annual general meeting in 1992:

- Dr J. N. Adams
- Professor C. E. Bosworth
- Professor N. F. R. Crafts
- Professor W. E. Davies
- Sir Geoffrey de Ballaigue
- Dr A. I. Doyle
- Dr R. P. Duncan-Jones
- Professor P. Haggett
- Dr A. F. Heath
- Dr R. G. Hood
- Professor R. A. Hudson
- Professor J. I. Israel
- B. J. Kemp
- Professor M. A. King
- Professor M. Kinkead-Weekes
- Professor C. N. J. Mann
- Professor P. J. Marshall
- Dr H. M. R. E. Mayr-Harting
- Professor M. I. Podro
- Dr A. W. Raitt
- Professor R. Rose
- W. L. St Clair
- Dr G. C. Stone
- Professor S. R. Sutherland
- Professor R. G. Swinburne
- E. P. Thompson
- Professor C. J. G. Wright

=== Senior fellows ===
- Professor J. H. Burns
- Professor D. H. Green
- A. R. A. Hobson
- Professor T. W. Hutchinson
- Professor H. M. Pelling
- Professor D. S. Thomson

== 1991 ==
The following fellows of the British Academy were elected at the annual general meeting in 1991:

- Professor J. M. Anderson
- Professor B. A. Barton
- Professor G. Beer
- Professor J. Bennett, Philosophy
- Professor R. J. Bennett
- Professor A. H. Brown
- Professor T. C. Cave
- Rev. H. E. J. Cowdrey
- J. S. Flemming
- Professor J. P. A. Gould
- Professor R. G. Gruffydd
- Professor M. J. Kemp
- Professor I. Kershaw
- Professor J. H. W. G. Liebeschuetz
- Dr R. H. Lonsdale
- Professor A. Mackay
- Dr H. C. G. Matthew
- Professor D. M. G. Newbery
- Professor P. K. O'Brien
- Sir Malcolm Pasley
- Professor J. D. Y. Peel
- Professor M. L. G. Redhead
- Dr A. F. Rodger
- Professor Lord Russell
- Dr R. M. Smith
- Dr I. M. Stead

=== Senior fellows ===
- Professor D. Abercrombie
- Rev. Professor C. F. Evans
- Professor A. T. Hatto
- K. R. Maxwell-Hyslop
- Dr G. F. Nuttall
- Professor C. Thurstan Shaw
- Dr D. P. Waley
- Professor T. S. Willan

== 1990 ==
The following fellows of the British Academy were elected at the annual general meeting in 1990:

- Professor J. M. Bately
- Professor J. O. Bayley
- Dr C. A. Bayly
- Dr T. C. W. Blanning
- Professor M. E. F. Bloch
- Professor C. P. Brand
- Professor K. N. Chaudhuri
- Professor J. M. Finnis
- Professor C. A. E. Goodhart
- Professor J. E. S. Hayward
- Dr L. Hellinga
- Professor J. M. Hollis
- Dr R. J. P. Kain
- Dr M. H. Keen
- Professor J. D. M. H. Laver
- Professor G. L. Mann
- Dr J. F. Matthews
- Dr P. A. Mellars
- Dr P. M. North
- Professor C. Peacocke
- J. M. Rawson
- Professor A. Roberts
- M. F. Scott
- Professor C. Shackle
- Professor J. C. Shepherdson
- Dr P. A. Slack
- Jon Stallworthy
- Professor J. P. Stern
- Professor M. O. Talbot
- Professor D. C. Watt
- Dr S. R. West
- Rev. Professor R. D. Williams
- Dr D. S. M. Wilson

=== Senior fellows ===
- Professor M. C. Bradbrook
- Professor W. R. Brock
- Dr A. C. Crombie
- Professor I. de Madariaga
- Professor J. C. Mitchell
- Professor J. K. B. M. Nicholas
- Dr G. D. Ramsay
- Professor P. J. de la F. Wiles
