= Girl with a Mandolin =

1910 painting by Pablo Picasso

Girl with a Mandolin (Fanny Tellier)
- Jeune fille à la mandoline (French)
- Artist: Pablo Picasso
- Year: 1910
- Medium: Oil on canvas
- Movement: Analytic Cubism
- Dimensions: 100.3 cm × 73.6 cm (39.5 in × 29.0 in)
- Location: Museum of Modern Art, New York City
- Accession: 966.1979

Girl with a Mandolin (Fanny Tellier) (Note: Additionally known by its French title, Jeune fille à la mandoline ('Young Girl with a Mandolin'), and as Portrait of Fanny Tellier.) is a 1910 Cubist painting by Pablo Picasso. The artwork was one of Picasso’s early Analytic Cubist creations, through which he aimed to reduce organic forms to geometric shapes. It shows the model Fanny Tellier in the nude, with her hands on a mandolin. Tellier volunteered to model for Picasso but, according to the latter, eventually refused to continue sitting for him after the painting took longer to complete than she had expected. Picasso accordingly left the portrait unfinished, though later suggested that he could have done nothing further to improve it.

Picasso painted Girl with a Mandolin late in the spring of 1910, shortly before leaving Paris for the Catalan town of Cadaqués. It was a response to Woman with a Mandolin, a more abstract treatment of the same theme by his friend Georges Braque, and followed two other works by Picasso under the same title. It has been analysed as a partial move away from naturalism, though comparatively legible and close to the visible form by contrast with later Cubist works, and as an important step in Picasso's movement towards focusing on the study of geometric planes. It has also been interpreted both as a de-eroticised nude and as containing autoerotic implications. The art historian T. J. Clark called it "the most ingenious of Picasso's portraits".

The painting was owned by Picasso's German-born friend Wilhelm Uhde. It was exhibited at the Armory Show of 1913, and confiscated by the French state during the First World War as "enemy property". Its later owners included the art dealer Paul Rosenberg, the poet André Breton, and Picasso's friend Roland Penrose. Penrose sold it to Nelson Rockefeller, the future Vice President of the United States, who bequeathed it to the Museum of Modern Art in New York City; it has been held there since Rockefeller's death in 1979.

== Description ==
Girl with a Mandolin is an oil on canvas portrait by the Spanish painter Pablo Picasso of Fanny Tellier, a young model who had posed for several friends of Picasso's. The painting is in the Cubist style, an avant-garde visual idiom developed by Picasso and his friend Georges Braque which rejected a fixed viewpoint in favour of building a sense of the subject by showing multiple views at once, often built up from fragmentary elements.

Tellier is portrayed nude, holding a mandolin, which is rendered in a similar grey-brown colour to her body. Her face is shown in three-quarter profile, though the profile itself is flattened against the viewer's visual field rather than being rendered in three dimensions. Different parts of the figure are rendered with different levels of detail: the mandolin is constructed volumetrically, as are Tellier's breasts and arms, while her head consists entirely of two flat planes. The portrait adopts an inconsistent perspective, with features at different implied depths aligned with each other, creating disconnection between its different parts.

== Background ==
Woman with a Mandolin, by Georges Braque, Spring 1910

Picasso painted Girl with a Mandolin in Paris, where he was living in his apartment–studio at 11 Boulevard de Clichy, late in the spring of 1910. The painting was a response to Braque, who had produced a portrait titled Woman with a Mandolin earlier that year. Picasso had also produced two earlier works, in 1908 and 1909, under the title Woman with a Mandolin; he said that he used mandolins in his work because they mirrored the form of the female body. The painting was one of the last Picasso made before leaving Paris, in June 1910, to spend two months in the Catalan town of Cadaqués.

Tellier presented herself to Picasso to be painted; according to Picasso, he was reluctant to use her as a model because her presence stopped him "from painting what [he] wanted". Picasso gave different accounts of how his work on the painting ended: in the one he generally told, Tellier grew impatient with him as the painting took longer to complete than she had expected, and refused to return after several sittings, claiming illness. Picasso had not yet finished the portrait and stopped work on it. In another version, which he told to his friend and biographer Pierre Daix after the death of Picasso's model and lover Fernande Olivier, (Note: For Olivier's relationship to Picasso, see Rafart Planas 2023, p. 201.) the portrait's abandonment was related to Olivier's jealousy of Tellier, to whom Picasso was attracted. Roland Penrose – another of Picasso's friends and biographers – wrote that the artist had told him that the painting's unfinished state may have been for the best; according to Daix, Picasso shrugged when asked if the painting was unfinished, and said "I really don't see what I could have added".

Picasso did not reveal Tellier's identity until decades later, and a 1969 study questioned whether the final painting bore any relation to its model. The art historian Anne Carnegie Edgerton suggested in 1980 that the painting's similarities with a 1910 drawing by Picasso titled Nude Woman, as well as with his later portraits of a figure identified as "Mademoiselle Léonie", might suggest that the works were all executed from the same model.

== Analysis ==
Portrait of Wilhelm Uhde, painted by Picasso earlier in 1910

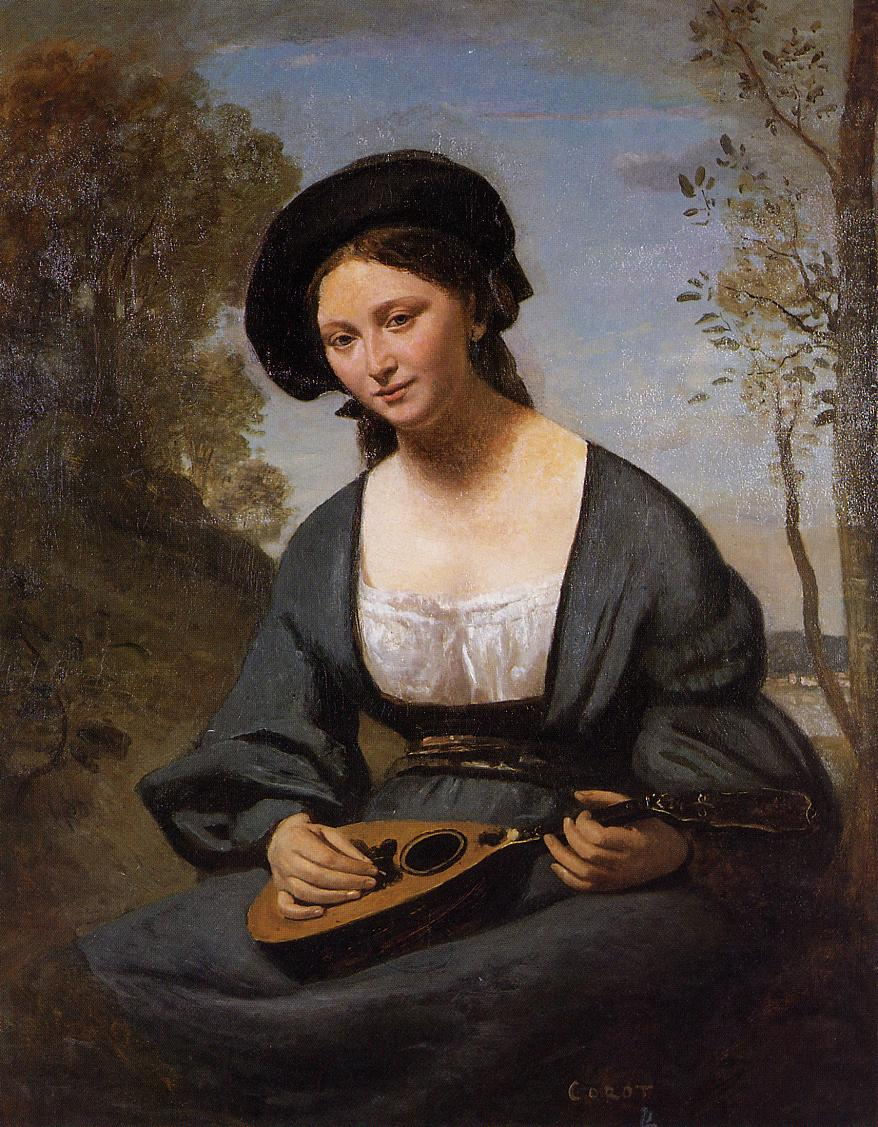
Woman in a Toque with a Mandolin by Camille Corot, c. 1850 – c. 1855

Girl with a Mandolin is an early example of Analytic Cubism, a development within the Cubist movement by which objects were rendered as a series of geometric volumes, replacing the curved lines of nature with straight edges. The art historian David Cottington contrasts the legibility of Girl with a Mandolin, in which the shape and features of Tellier can be clearly recognised, with Braque's Woman with a Mandolin. The artist and art historian John Golding similarly takes the contrast between the two as an indication that Picasso's "engagement with the image was much stronger ... and that his approach remained more volumetric". In a 2003 study of Picasso, Brigitte Leal, Christine Piot and Marie-Laure Bernadac called the painting "a decisive turning point" in Picasso's development from studying volumes towards studying planes. The curator William Rubin contrasted it with the works painted by Picasso in Horta de Sant Joan, the Catalan village where he spent most of May–September 1909, in that it uses a shallower perspective, more painterly brushwork, and less severe transitions.

The art critic Leo Steinberg traces the work's "formal–representational syntax" to Picasso's earlier study of African sculpture. Both Penrose and the classicist John Ferguson have compared its use of proportion to that of ancient Greek architecture. The art historian Paul Hayes Tucker has suggested that the painting's use of shape and light may have been inspired by the photographs Picasso took around Horta during the summer of 1909.

A 1969 commentary for the Museum of Modern Art (MoMA) in New York City judged that the painting minimised the identity of its model to a much greater extent than Picasso's portraits of his male friends, and that more realism had been employed in rendering the mandolin than the human subject. Its author described the portrait as an exercise in applying Cubist principles to a painting in the manner of the realist portraitist Camille Corot. Rubin similarly suggests that Picasso may have been inspired by seeing an exhibition of Corot's work at the Salon d'Automne art show of 1909. The art historian Timothy Hilton specifically names Corot's Woman in a Toque with a Mandolin, shown at the 1909 Salon d'Automne, as a likely inspiration.

Rosalind Krauss writes that Picasso's style effects "the withdrawal of the tactile and carnal from the field of the visual", and that Picasso himself considered this a grave loss mandated by the logical principles of Cubism. (Note: Quoted in Cottington 2004, p. 48.) Anna C. Chave writes that the positioning of the subject's hand near the sound-hole of the mandolin "carries a mild autoerotic suggestion", though concurs with Krauss that the painting represents Picasso's relegation of what the former calls the "carnal dimensions" of touch and depth away from the viewer's sight. The film scholar Noa Steimatsky interprets the instrument's sound-hole as an analogue of the human eye.

=== Iconicity versus abstraction ===
Golding writes:

The fact that at the time Picasso saw the work as unfinished, allows us an insight into his aesthetic intentions and his technical procedure. In the first place, that legibility of this canvas demonstrates conclusively that although cubist paintings were becoming more abstract in appearance, the artists were still deeply conditioned, at least in the early stages of their works, by the material existence and the physical appearance of their subjects.

External image
- Portrait of Ambroise Vollard (1910), by Pablo Picasso

Cottington describes the painting as "a stretching of [iconicity] to its limit", rather than a complete abandonment of the concept in favour of abstraction. The cultural critic R. Bruce Elder identifies certain points de capiton ("anchoring points"), such as the subject's hands and elbow and the mandolin's face, within the composition. He uses these as evidence for the distance between the painting's visual form and the real-life forms on which it is based, as well as for Picasso's intention to ensure that the portrait's subject remained discernible. Golding suggests that, had Picasso continued work on the painting, it would have become more elaborate and more abstract, similar to the Portrait of Ambroise Vollard he painted in the same year. Hilton similarly suggests that Picasso might have made the painting more dense, with more severe lines and less variation in colour.

Penrose describes the painting as being composed through "the process of elimination of resemblance to the outer appearance", with ambiguity as to whether the subject's right breast is nude or clothed, and as to whether the rectangular form to the right of her face is a shadow or intended to represent part of that face. He writes that it combines classical proportions with modernist conception, and that "the human form has rarely been dissolved and recreated with more consummate skill". Golding described it as "one of the most beautiful, lyrical and accessible of all Cubist paintings", while the art historian T. J. Clark called it "the most ingenious of Picasso's portraits".

== Exhibition and ownership history ==
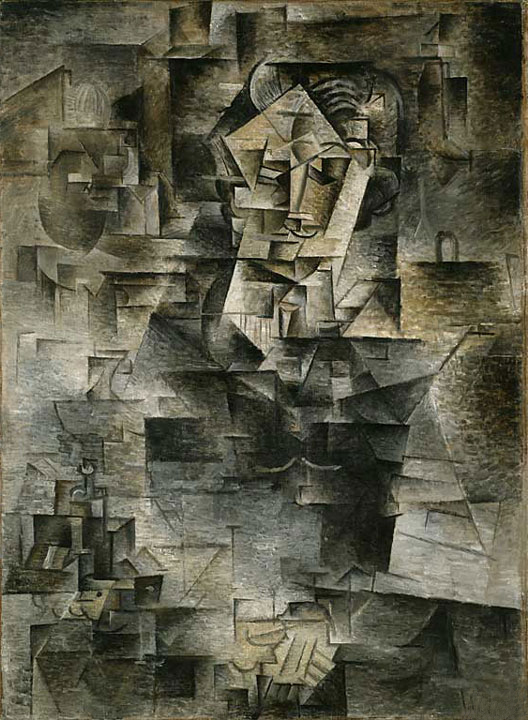
Portrait of Daniel-Henry Kahnweiler, painted by Picasso in 1910

Between 1910 and 1914, the painting was held by Picasso's friend Wilhelm Uhde, a German citizen who maintained an art gallery in Paris. Picasso's dealer, Daniel-Henry Kahnweiler, sent Girl with a Mandolin, along with six other paintings including three of Picasso's, to be exhibited in the United States for the Armory Show of 1913. An image of the painting was shown in the New York Times, leading the press to characterise the show as Cubist and to widely satirise it.

During the First World War, the painting was confiscated by the French state as "enemy property", since France was at war with Uhde's native Germany; it was sold on 30 May 1921 via the Hôtel Drouot auction-house to Christian Tetzen-Lund of Copenhagen. It was sold again in that city, on 18–19 May 1925, at the auction of Tetzen-Lund's collection: the buyer was the Parisian art dealer Paul Rosenberg, who may have been working on behalf of the German Galerie Alfred Flechtheim. At some point Rosenberg passed it to the poet André Breton, through whom the Belgian collector René Gaffé acquired it before 1931.

The painting was further exhibited at the Zwemmer Gallery in London in June 1936. Penrose purchased it from Gaffé in 1938. Nelson Rockefeller, who later became Governor of New York and Vice President of the United States, bought it from Penrose in November 1956 via the art historian Alfred H. Barr Jr. It was exhibited at the MoMA in May–September 1957 in an exhibition commemorating Picasso's 75th birthday. Rockefeller had bequeathed it to the MoMA by 1958, when it was part of an exhibition of promised works there. It has been held by the museum since his death in 1979.

== Bibliography ==
- Bois, Yve-Alain (2012). "Pablo Picasso: The Cadaqués Experiment". In Dickerman, Leah; Affron, Matthew (eds.). Inventing Abstraction, 1910–1925: How a Radical Idea Changed Modern Art. New York: Museum of Modern Art. pp. 40–45. ISBN 978-0-87070-828-2.
- Bozo, Dominique (1980). Picasso from the Musée Picasso, Paris: Walker Art Center, Minneapolis, 10 February Through 30 March 1980. Minneapolis: Walker Art Center. ISBN 0-935640-01-0.
- Brauer, Fae (2017). "Dealing with Cubism: Daniel-Henry Kahnweiler's Perilous Internationalism". In Catterson, Lynn (ed.). Dealing Art on Both Sides of the Atlantic, 1860–1940. Leiden: Brill. pp. 115–160. ISBN 978-90-04-34298-9.
- Chave, Anna C. (2005). "New Encounters with Les Demoiselles d'Avignon: Gender, Race, and the Origin of Cubism". In Garrard, Mary D.; Broude, Norma (eds.). Reclaiming Female Agency: Feminist Art History After Postmodernism. Oakland: University of California Press. pp. 301–324. ISBN 0-520-24252-1.
- Clark, T. J. (2023). Picasso and Truth: From Cubism to Guernica. Princeton University Press. ISBN 978-0-691-20952-4.
- Clarke, Michael (2010). "Cubism". The Concise Oxford Dictionary of Art Terms (2nd ed.). Oxford University Press. ISBN 978-0-19-172714-6 – via Oxford Reference.
- Cottington, David (2004). Cubism and Its Histories. Manchester University Press. ISBN 0-7190-5004-9.
- Daix, Pierre (1979). Picasso: The Cubist Years 1907–1916. London: Thames and Hudson. ISBN 0-8212-0672-9.
- Daix, Pierre (1994) [1987]. Picasso: Life and Art. Translated by Emmet, Olivia. London: Thames and Hudson. ISBN 0-500-27742-7 – via Internet Archive.
- Edgerton, Anne Carnegie (1980). "Picasso's 'Nude Woman' of 1910". The Burlington Magazine. 122 (928): 498–503. ISSN 0007-6287. JSTOR 880056.
- Elder, R. Bruce (2017). Cubism and Futurism: Spiritual Machines and the Cinematic Effect. Waterloo: Wilfred Laurier University Press. ISBN 978-1-77112-272-6.
- Ferguson, John (1962). "Picasso and the Classics". Greece and Rome. 9 (2): 183–192. doi:10.1017/S0017383500020544. JSTOR 641819.
- Ganteführer-Trier, Anne; Grosenick, Uta (2006). Cubism. Cologne: Taschen. ISBN 3-8228-2958-7.
- Golding, John (1988) [1959]. Cubism: A History and an Analysis, 1907–1914 (3rd ed.). Cambridge, Massachusetts: Harvard University Press. ISBN 0-674-17929-3 – via Internet Archive.
- Golding, John (1994). Visions of the Modern. Oakland: University of California Press. ISBN 0-520-04207-7.
- Green, Christopher (21 March 1980). "The Invention of Cubism". Times Literary Supplement: 331. ISSN 0307-661X.
- Hilton, Timothy (1975). Picasso. The World of Art. Toronto and New York: Oxford University Press. ISBN 0-500-20144-7.
- Hochberg, Julian (2003). "Perception". Grove Art Online. Oxford Art Online.
- Leal, Brigitte; Piot, Christine; Bernadac, Marie-Laure (2003). The Ultimate Picasso. New York: Harry N. Abrams. ISBN 0-8109-9114-4.
- Mallen, Enrique (2018). Pablo Picasso: The Interaction Between Collectors and Exhibitions, 1899–1939. Liverpool University Press. ISBN 978-1-83624-280-2.
- Penrose, Roland (1981). Picasso: His Life and Work. Oakland: University of California Press. ISBN 0-520-08792-5.
- Rafart Planas, Claustre (2023). "Portrait de Benedetta Canals". In Bouvier, Raphaël (ed.). Picasso: The Blue and Rose Periods. Berlin: Hatje Cantz. p. 201. ISBN 978-3-7757-5579-5.
- Rubin, William (1972). Picasso in the Collection of the Museum of Modern Art. New York: Museum of Modern Art. ISBN 0-87070-537-7.
- Steimatsky, Noa (2017). The Face on Film. Oxford University Press. ISBN 978-0-19-986316-7.
- Steinberg, Leo (2022). "The Polemical Part". In Schwartz, Sheila (ed.). Picasso: Selected Essays. University of Chicago Press. pp. 140–153. ISBN 978-0-226-81659-3.
- Tucker, Paul Hayes (1982). "Picasso, Photography, and the Development of Cubism". The Art Bulletin. 64 (2): 288–299. doi:10.2307/3050221. ISSN 0004-3079. JSTOR 3050221.
- Vargish, Thomas; Mook, Delo E. (1999). Inside Modernism: Relativity Theory, Cubism, Narrative. New Haven: Yale University Press. ISBN 0-300-07613-4.
