= Mattei Dogan =

French sociologist

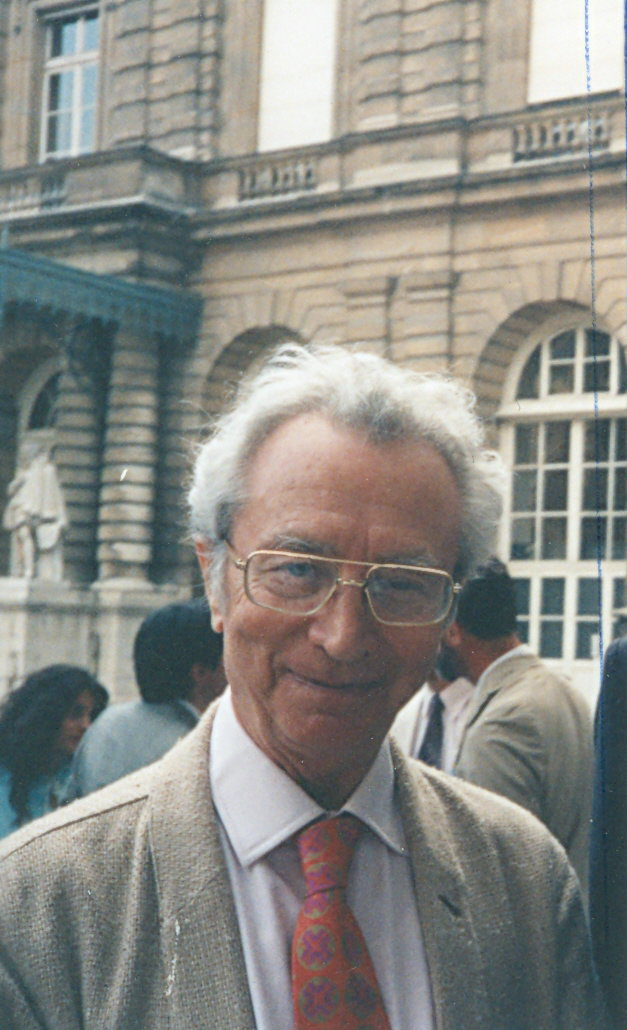
- Born: October 16, 1920; Curtea de Argeș, Kingdom of Romania
- Died: October 10, 2010 (aged 89); Paris, France
- Education: Sciences Po; Sorbonne University
- Scientific career
- Fields: Political sociology
- Workplaces: French National Center for Scientific Research; University of California, Los Angeles

Mattei Dogan (16 October 1920 – 10 October 2010) was a Romanian-born French political sociologist and senior research officer emeritus of the French National Center for Scientific Research (CNRS) and professor emeritus of political science of the University of California, Los Angeles. Over a period of 22 years, he also taught at UCLA, Indiana University, Yale University, the Institute of Statistical Mathematics in Tokyo, the University of Florence, and the Russian Academy of Sciences. He was a foreign honorary member of the Romanian Academy from 1992, and he received the CNRS Silver Medal.

Born in Curtea de Argeș, Romania, he obtained a B.A. from the Institut d’Études Politiques de Paris and an M.A. in History and Philosophy from Sorbonne University, where he subsequently received a doctorate. In 1953, he joined the CNRS in Paris. He chaired the Research Committee on Political Elites of the International Political Science Association (IPSA) and the Research Committee on Comparative Sociology of the International Sociological Association (ISA). He was also the founder of the Foundation Mattei Dogan that is devoted exclusively to the social sciences, and which is recognized as a non-profit organization by both the French and American governments.

== Work ==
His main research domains include elite studies, international comparative analysis, and interdisciplinary approaches. His publications have dealt with the relationship between political behavior and religious behavior, political legitimacy and the ruling class. He also worked on the society and political regime of Italy.

His professional itinerary was marked by his affiliation with the Committee on Political Sociology (ISA and IPSA), which played a pioneering role in comparative research and where he was in the company of scholars like Giovanni Sartori, Seymour Martin Lipset, Stein Rokkan, Richard Rose, Juan Linz, and other comparativists. During his long career, which spanned more than a half-century, he moved from empirical research on topics like voter behavior to more encompassing theoretical work, his last publication being "Is There A Ruling Class in France?".

== Publications ==
- Dogan, Mattei (ed.), "Political Mistrust and the Discrediting of Politicians," Leiden: Brill, 2005
- Dogan, Mattei (ed.), "Elite Configurations at the Apex of Power," Leiden: Brill, 2003
- Dogan, Mattei., "Paradigms in the Social Sciences," in International Encyclopedia of the Social and Behavioral Sciences, Volume 16, 2001
- Dogan, Mattei., "Political science and the other social sciences," in A new handbook of political science, 1996
