= David Apter =

American political scientist and sociologist

David E. Apter
- Born: David Ernest Apter; December 18, 1924; Brooklyn, New York
- Died: May 4, 2010 (aged 85); North Haven, Connecticut
- Occupation: Political scientist
- Known for: Sociology of developing nations
- Notable work: The Politics of Modernization

David Ernest Apter (December 18, 1924 – May 4, 2010) was an American political scientist and sociologist. He was Henry J. Heinz Professor of Comparative Political and Social Development and senior research scientist at Yale University.

He was born on December 18, 1924. He taught at Northwestern University, the University of Chicago (where he was the executive secretary of the Committee for the Comparative Study of New Nations), the University of California, (where he was director of the Institute of International Studies), and Yale University, where he held a joint appointment in political science and sociology and served as director of the Social Science Division, chair of Sociology, and was a founding fellow of the Whitney Humanities Center. He was elected a Fellow of the American Academy of Arts and Sciences in 1966.

He was a Guggenheim Fellow, a visiting fellow at All Souls College, Oxford, a Fellow of the Institute for Advanced Study in Princeton, New Jersey, a Fellow of the Center for Advanced Study in the Behavioral Sciences in Palo Alto, California, a Fellow of the Netherlands Institute for Advanced Study, as well as a Phi Beta Kappa Lecturer. He did field research on development, democratization and political violence in Africa, Latin America, Japan (Sanrizuka Struggle etc.), and China.

In 2006 he was the first recipient of the Foundation Mattei Dogan prize for contributions to Interdisciplinary research.

Apter died in his home in North Haven, Connecticut, from complications due to cancer on May 4, 2010.

== Analysis ==
Writing with Tony Saich on Yan'an Rectification Movement, Apter described the group study of texts and the collective self-transformation process in the movement as a form of "exegetical bonding" which, along with Mao Zedong's personal charisma, was a major factor in his becoming the primary "ideological steward" of the Chinese Communist Party.

== Bibliography ==
=== Monographs ===
- Apter, David E. (1955). The Gold Coast in Transition. Princeton University Press.
- —— (1961). The Political Kingdom in Uganda: A Study in Bureaucratic Nationalism. Princeton University Press.
- —— (1963). Ghana in Transition. New York: Atheneum.
- —— (1965). The Politics of Modernization. University of Chicago Press. (Japanese, Turkish, and Indonesian editions subsequently published)
- —— (1971). Choice and the Politics of Allocation. New Haven: Yale University Press. ISBN 9780300014440.
- Apter, David E.; Sawa, Nagayo (1984). Against the State: Politics and Social Protest in Japan. Harvard University Press. ISBN 978-0-674-00921-9. (Japanese edition: Iwanami)
- Apter, David E. (1987). Rethinking Development: Modernization, Dependency, and Post-Modern Politics. SAGE Publications. ISBN 0803929722.
- Apter, David E.; Saich, Tony (1994). Revolutionary Discourse in Mao's Republic. Harvard University Press. ISBN 978-0-674-76780-5.

=== Essay collections ===
- Apter, David E. (1973). Political Change. Frank Cass & Company. ISBN 0714629413.

Received the Woodrow Wilson Foundation award for the best book of the year on government, politics, or international affairs)

=== Edited volumes ===
- Apter, David E., ed. (1964). Ideology and Discontent. The Free Press of Glencoe. ISBN 0029007607.
- Apter, David E.; Joll, James, eds. (1971). Anarchism Today. Studies in Comparative Development. Macmillan. ISBN 0333120418.
- Apter, David E.; Rosberg, Carl G., eds. (1993). Political Development and the New Realism in Sub-Saharan Africa. University Press of Virginia. ISBN 0813914795.
- Apter, David E., ed. (1997). The Legitimization of Violence. NYU Press. ISBN 978-0814706497.
