= Maurice Scott =

Maurice Scott may refer to:

- Sir Maurice Scott (politician) (1910–1976), Fijian lawyer and politician
- Maurice D. G. Scott (1895–1918), British World War I flying ace
- Maurice FitzGerald Scott (1924–2009), Irish economist

== See also ==
- Maurus Scott (c. 1579–1612), English lawyer, Benedictine monk and priest
