= Making Peace with the Planet =

Book by Barry Commoner

- Author: Barry Commoner
- Publisher: Pantheon Books
- Publication date: 1990
- Pages: 292 pp.
- ISBN: 978-0-394-56598-9
- OCLC: 20561508

Making Peace With the Planet is a 1990 book by Barry Commoner. Commoner argues that, despite billions of dollars spent to save the environment, America is still in a deep environmental crisis. The book argues that environmental pollution can be prevented only through fundamental redesign of the way we produce goods.
