= James Joll =

British historian and lecturer

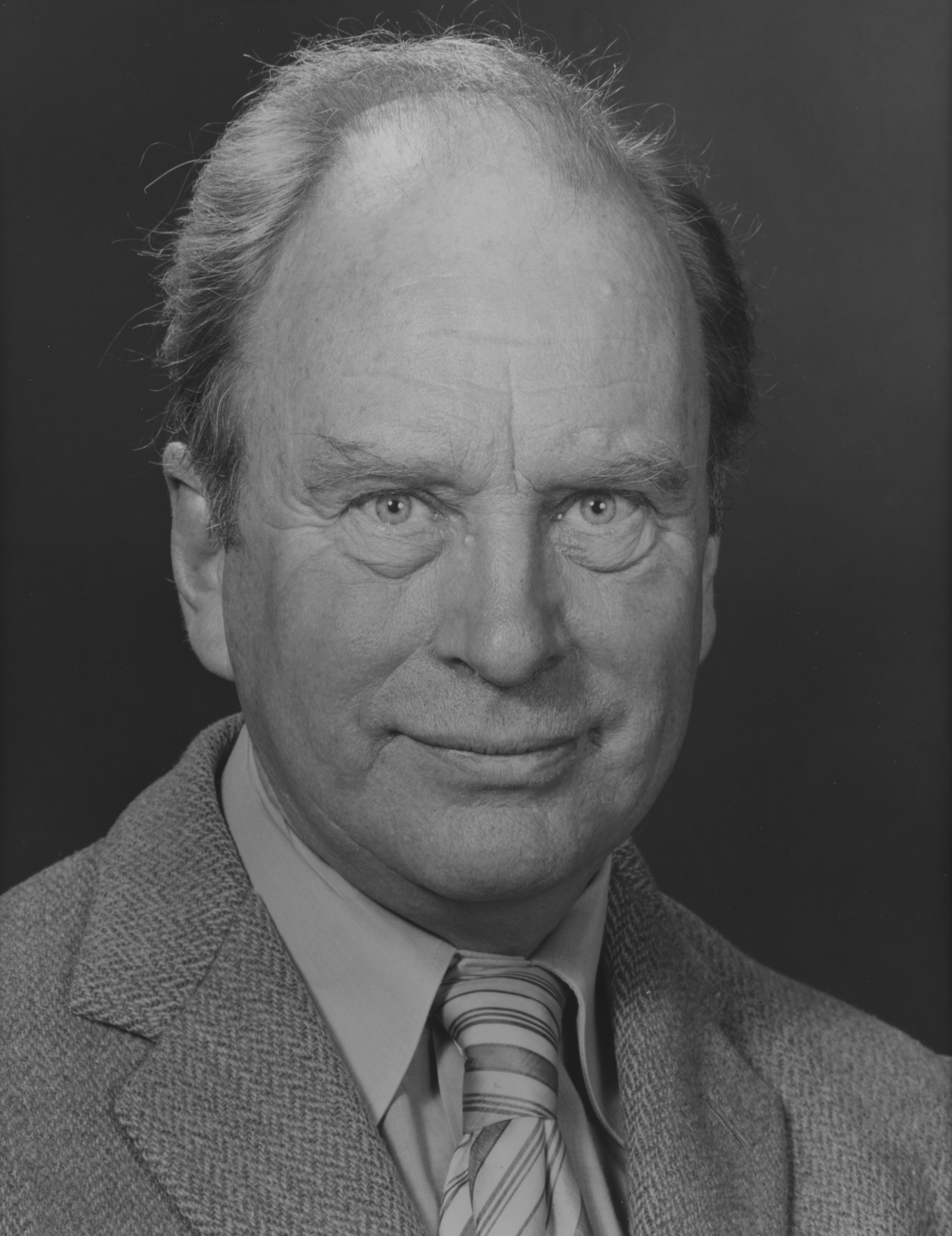
James Joll

James Bysse Joll FBA (21 June 1918 – 12 July 1994) was a British historian and university lecturer whose works included The Origins of the First World War and Europe Since 1870. He also wrote on the history of anarchism and socialism.

== Life and career ==
Joll was born on 21 June 1918 in Bristol and was educated at Winchester, the University of Bordeaux and New College, Oxford. He left to join the British Army in 1940, eventually serving in the Special Operations Executive. He returned to Oxford after World War II, completed his studies, and became an instructor there. He was a Fellow and Tutor in Politics from 1947 until 1950. He then transferred to St Antony's College. In 1955 he met the painter and art historian John Golding; the two men formed a long relationship which lasted until Joll's death.

While at Oxford, Joll wrote a book on the Second International (1955) and a book on Léon Blum, Walther Rathenau, and Filippo Tommaso Marinetti, called Intellectuals in Politics (1960). In 1964 he published The Anarchists, which showed his intertwined interests in the culture, events, political philosophy, and individual personalities forming the history of a Leftist movement.

In 1967 Joll left St Antony's, Oxford to teach at the London School of Economics, as the Stevenson Professor of International History. His best known work was Europe Since 1870: an International History, which appeared in 1973. He returned to biography in 1977, with his book on Italian Marxist intellectual Antonio Gramsci; he was elected a Fellow of the British Academy in the same year. Several prizes in the Department of International History at the London School of Economics remain named in his honour. Later, he gave refuge to Anthony Blunt, Golding's colleague at the Courtauld Institute and former teacher, after Blunt's exposure as a former Soviet spy, for which Joll was attacked in the press.

Following his retirement in 1981, he became Emeritus Professor of the University of London. In 1982, Joll published The Origins of the First World War, which he updated for a second edition in 1991. The book was further updated with insights from contemporary research by Gordon Martel for the 3rd and 4th editions in 2007 and 2023, after Joll's death.

Joll died 12 July 1994 from the cancer of the larynx. In his obituary notice for The Independent newspaper, the historian Sir Michael Howard, noted:

Joll's real focus was the history of ideas broadly conceived – philosophical, ethical and aesthetic, as well as political – and the interface between this and the political history of Europe in the 19th and 20th centuries. He firmly believed that history was made by people rather than by dispassionate forces. But he also believed that one could not understand why people act as they do unless one also understands the influences that moulded their minds.

== Works ==
- Intellectuals in politics: Three biographical essays. London: Weidenfeld & Nicolson. 1960. LCCN 60051294.
- The Second International, 1889–1914 (new ed.). London: Weidenfeld & Nicolson. 1968. LCCN 78390757.
- Apter, David E.; Joll, James, eds. (1971). Anarchism Today. Studies in Comparative Politics. Macmillan. doi:10.1007/978-1-349-01074-5. ISBN 978-0-333-12041-5. OCLC 195124.
- Gramsci. London: Fontana Modern Masters. 1977.
- Antonio Gramsci. New York: Viking Press. 1977. ISBN 0-670-12942-9. LCCN 78064513.
- The Anarchists (2nd ed.). Cambridge, Massachusetts: Harvard University Press. 1980. ISBN 0-674-03641-7. LCCN 80010503.
- Europe since 1870: An international history (3rd ed.). Middlesex, England, New York: Penguin. 1983. ISBN 0-14-022477-7.
- The origins of the First World War (2nd ed.). London, New York: Longman. 1992. ISBN 0-582-08920-4. LCCN 91023178.
