= David Anfam =

English art historian (1955–2024)

Anfam in 2024

David Anthony Neil Anfam (12 May 1955 – 21 August 2024) was an English art historian, author and curator, best known for his voluminous writings on abstract expressionism. He was the senior consulting curator for The Clyfford Still Museum in Denver, Colorado, and the director of its research center.

== Biography ==
David Anthony Neil Anfam was born in London on 12 May 1955, one of seven siblings. His father was a major fan of American culture, so Anfam was "brought up on a diet of Frank Sinatra, jazz, film noir, Hemingway, silk suits, Betty Crocker cake mix and big-finned cars" during his childhood. According to Anfam, this led to his interest in abstract expressionism.

Anfam attended the Courtauld Institute of Art in London, where he received a Bachelor's degree in Art History and then earned his PhD in 1984 for his dissertation about Clyfford Still, which was written under the mentorship of John Golding.

His first book, Abstract Expressionism, was published in 1990 by Thames & Hudson.

Anfam was the author of the 1998 catalogue raisonné on the work of Mark Rothko, Mark Rothko: The Works on Canvas, which was published by Yale University Press. It featured over 830 known paintings by Rothko, 400 of which were previously unrecognized or rarely recognized, as well as a 100-page introduction. His publication won the Mitchell Prize for the History of Art in 2000 and contextualized Rothko's work, life, and influences. Critic John Russell called the volume, which took ten years to research and compile, as "a book for all seasons". In 2009, Anfam contributed a catalogue raisonné for Anish Kapoor that was published by Phaidon Press. Anfam worked for the company as Commissioning Editor from 2004 to 2012.

Anfam also contributed numerous articles to the Art Newspaper and reviewed books and exhibitions for that publication.

Anfam wrote catalogue essays for many artists, including Wayne Thiebaud, Willem de Kooning, Arshile Gorky, Philip Guston, Edward Hopper, Franz Kline, Lee Krasner, Joan Mitchell, Jackson Pollock, Larry Poons, Richard Pousette-Dart, Robert Rauschenberg and Ad Reinhardt.

Anfam held a position at the Royal Academy of Arts. Anfam's scholarly contributions molded the understanding and appreciation of the New York School.

Anfam curated Bill Viola's Ocean Without a Shore at the 52nd Venice Biennale in 2007, in the Church of San Gallo, and at the 56th Venice Biennale in 2015 Jackson Pollock's Mural: Energy Made Visible at the Peggy Guggenheim Collection at the Palazzo Venier dei Leoni. In 2016 he co-curated (with Edith Devaney) the survey exhibition Abstract Expressionism at the Royal Academy of Arts in London. The Financial Times called it "The most pleasurable, provocative exhibition of American art in Britain this century." Between 2019 and 2020, he curated the exhibition Lynda Benglis: In the Realm of the Senses in Athens.

Anfam was in a relationship with Frederick Bearman until the latter man's death in 2016. Anfam died in London on 21 August 2024, at the age of 69.
