= Political legitimacy =

Right and acceptance of an authority

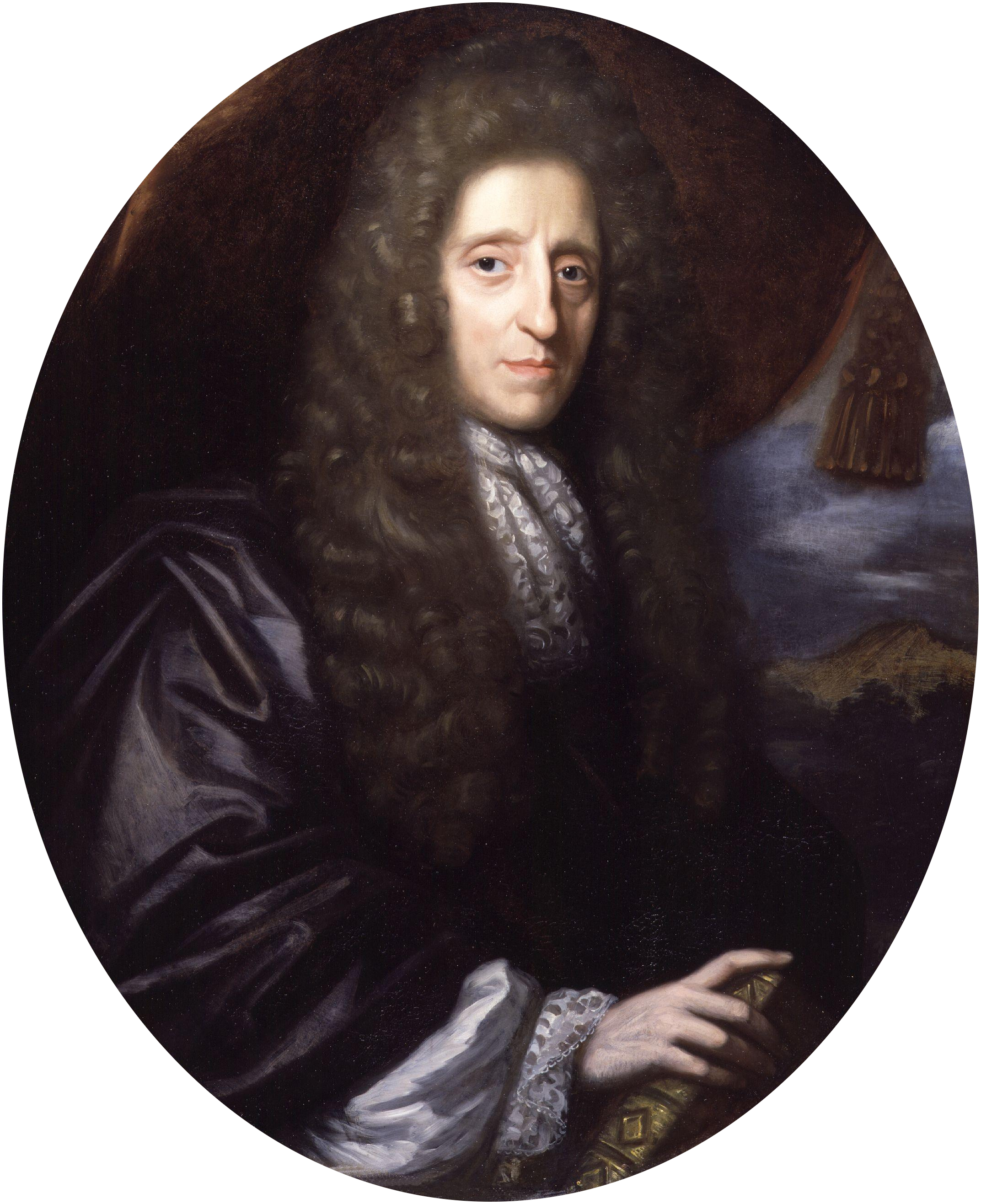
John Locke, who argued that consent of the governed confers political legitimacy

In political science, legitimacy is a concept concerning the right of an authority, usually a governing law or a regime, to rule the actions of a society. In political systems where this is not the case, unpopular regimes survive because they are considered legitimate by a small, influential elite. In Chinese political philosophy, since the historical period of the Zhou dynasty (1046–256 BC), the political legitimacy of a ruler and government was derived from the Mandate of Heaven, and unjust rulers who lost said mandate therefore lost the right to rule the people.

In moral philosophy, the term legitimacy is often positively interpreted as the normative status conferred by a governed people upon their governors' institutions, offices, and actions, based upon the belief that their government's actions are appropriate uses of power by a legally constituted government. The dominant view in moral philosophy has been that legitimate political authority entails political obligations. However, some scholars have differentiated the question of what constitutes a legitimate authority to be distinct from the question of political obligations.

The Enlightenment-era English social philosopher John Locke (1632–1704) said that political legitimacy derives from popular explicit and implicit consent of the governed: "The argument of the [Second] Treatise is that the government is not legitimate unless it is carried on with the consent of the governed." David Hume (1711–1776) contested the idea, saying that such consent was never given and could not be exited. The German political philosopher Dolf Sternberger said that "[l]egitimacy is the foundation of such governmental power as is exercised, both with a consciousness on the government's part that it has a right to govern, and with some recognition by the governed of that right". The American political sociologist Seymour Martin Lipset said that legitimacy also "involves the capacity of a political system to engender and maintain the belief that existing political institutions are the most appropriate and proper ones for the society". The American political scientist Robert A. Dahl explained legitimacy as a reservoir: so long as the water is at a given level, political stability is maintained, if it falls below the required level, political legitimacy is endangered.

== Types ==
=== Tradition, charisma and rational-legality ===
Legitimacy is "a value whereby something or someone is recognized and accepted as right and proper". In political science, legitimacy has traditionally been understood as the popular acceptance and recognition by the public of the authority of a political actor, whereby authority of such a regime has political power through consent and mutual understandings, not coercion. The three types of political legitimacy described by German sociologist Max Weber, in "Politics as Vocation", are traditional, charismatic, and rational-legal:

- Traditional legitimacy derives from societal custom and habit that emphasize the history of the authority of tradition. Traditionalists understand this form of rule as historically accepted, hence its continuity, because it is the way society has always been. Therefore, the institutions of traditional government usually are historically continuous, as in monarchy and tribalism.
- Charismatic legitimacy derives from the ideas and personal charisma of the leader, a person whose authoritative persona charms and psychologically dominates the people of the society to agreement with the government's régime and rule. A charismatic government usually features weak political and administrative institutions, because they derive authority from the persona of the leader, and usually disappear without the leader in power. However, if the charismatic leader has a successor, a government derived from charismatic legitimacy might continue.
- Rational-legal legitimacy derives from a system of institutional procedure, wherein government institutions establish and enforce law and order in the public interest. Therefore, it is through public trust that the government will abide the law that confers rational-legal legitimacy.

More recent scholarship distinguishes between multiple other types of legitimacy in an effort to draw distinctions between various approaches to the construct. These include empirical legitimacy versus normative legitimacy, instrumental versus substantive legitimacy, popular legitimacy, regulative legitimacy, and procedural legitimacy. Types of legitimacy draw distinctions that account for different sources of legitimacy, different frameworks for evaluating legitimacy, or different objects of legitimacy.

=== Interactive dignity ===
Legitimacy in conflict zones, where multiple authorities compete over authority and legitimacy, can rest on other sources. The theory of interactive dignity by Weigand shows that interactions are key for the construction of substantive legitimacy in such contexts. The aspect of an authority that most concerns people in the absence of other accountability mechanisms are its actions, particularly with regard to how authorities interact with them on a day-to-day basis. The value-based expectation people have with regard to such interactions is one of human dignity. People expect procedures to be fair and practices to be respectful, reflecting a serving rather than an extractive attitude. As long as authorities do not satisfy people's more immediate expectation of interactive dignity, people support and consider alternative authorities to be more legitimate.

== Forms ==
Egyptian divine authority Horus as a falcon

=== Numinous legitimacy ===
In a theocracy, government legitimacy derives from the spiritual authority of a god or a goddess.

In ancient Egypt (c. 3150 BC), the legitimacy of the dominion of a Pharaoh (god–king) was theologically established by a doctrine that posited the pharaoh as the Egyptian patron god Horus, son of Osiris.

=== Civil legitimacy ===
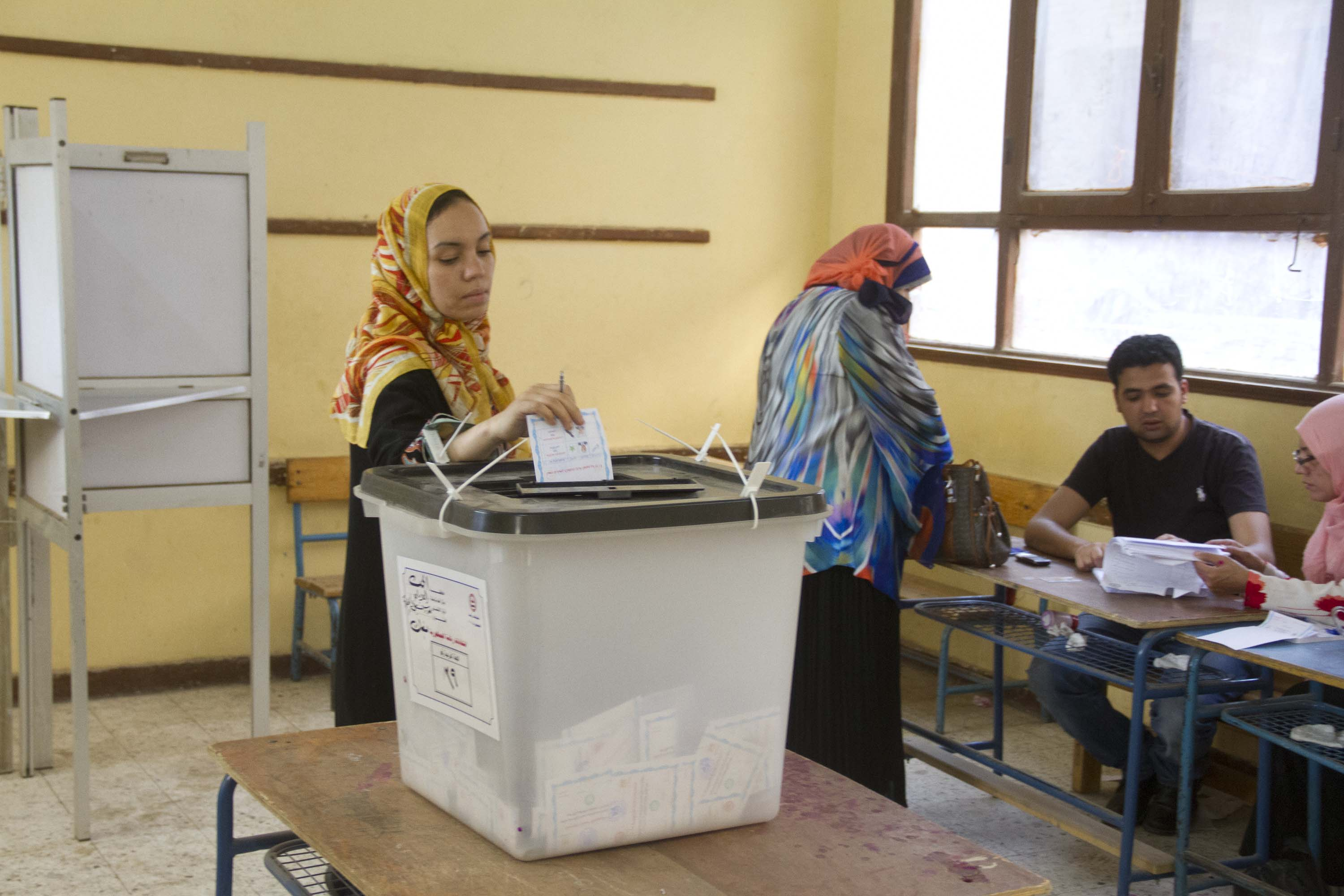
One measurement of civil legitimacy is who has access to the vote.

The political legitimacy of a civil government derives from agreement among the autonomous constituent institutions—legislative, judicial, executive—combined for the national common good. In the United States, this issue has surfaced around how voting is impacted by gerrymandering, the United States Electoral College's ability to produce winners by minority rule and discouragement of voter turnout outside of swing states, and the repeal of part of the Voting Rights Act in 2013.

Civil legitimacy can be granted through different measures for accountability than voting, such as financial transparency and stake-holder accountability.

In an effort to determine what makes a government legitimate, the Center for Public Impact launched a project to hold a global conversation about legitimacy stating, inviting citizens, academics and governments to participate. The organization also publishes case studies that consider the theme of legitimacy as it applies to projects in a number of different countries and cities including Bristol, Lebanon and Canada.

=== Dynastic legitimacy ===
Dynastic legitimacy refers to the acceptance of a monarch’s right to rule, typically derived from dynastic succession, this can be particularly potent when a reigning monarch has a weaker dynastic claim to the throne which they have obtained through conquest or support of domestic factions than a pretender as was the case with the British Jacobites. It can also be an argument in Republics where there are questions between royal lines as with the French legitimists who not only stand against the French Republic but also rival royalists such as the Orleanists and Bonapartists.

=== "Good" governance vs "bad" governance ===
The United Nations Human Rights Office of the High Commission (OHCHR) established standards of what is considered "good governance" that include the key attributes transparency, responsibility, accountability, participation and responsiveness (to the needs of the people).

=== Negative and positive legitimacy ===
Derived from the concepts of positive freedom and negative freedom distinguished by Isaiah Berlin, Abulof distinguishes between negative political legitimacy (NPL), which is about the object of legitimation (answering what is legitimate), and positive political legitimacy (PPL), which is about the source of legitimation (answering who is the 'legitimator'). NPL is concerned with establishing where to draw the line between good and bad. PPL with who should be drawing it in the first place. From the NPL perspective, political legitimacy emanates from appropriate actions; from a PPL perspective, it emanates from appropriate actors. In the social contract tradition, Hobbes and Locke focused on NPL (stressing security and liberty, respectively), while Rousseau focused more on PPL ("the people" as the legitimator). Arguably, political stability depends on both forms of legitimacy.

=== Instrumental and substantive legitimacy ===
Weber's understanding of legitimacy rests on shared values, such as tradition and rational-legality. But policies that aim at (re-)constructing legitimacy by improving the service delivery or 'output' of a state often only respond to shared needs. Therefore, Weigand distinguishes substantive sources of legitimacy from more instrumental ones. Instrumental legitimacy rests on "the rational assessment of the usefulness of an authority ..., describing to what extent an authority responds to shared needs. Instrumental legitimacy is very much based on the perceived effectiveness of service delivery. Conversely, substantive legitimacy is a more abstract normative judgment, which is underpinned by shared values. If a person believes that an entity has the right to exercise social control, he or she may also accept personal disadvantages."

=== Perceived legitimacy ===
Establishing legitimacy is not simply transactional; service provision, elections and rule of law do not automatically grant legitimacy. State legitimacy rests on citizens' perceptions and expectations of the state, and these may be co-constructed between state actors and citizens. What legitimizes a state is also contextually specific. McCullough et al. (2020) show that in different countries, provision of different services build state legitimacy. In Nepal public water provision was most associated with state legitimacy, while in Pakistan it was health services. But it is not only states that can build legitimacy. Other authorities, such as armed groups in a conflict zones, may construct legitimacy more successfully than the state in certain strata of the population.

=== Foundational and contingent legitimacy ===
Political theorist Ross Mittiga has proposed an alternative typology, consisting of two parts: foundational and contingent legitimacy. According to Mittiga, foundational legitimacy (FL) "pertains to a government's ability to ensure the safety and security of its citizens," while contingent legitimacy (CL) obtains in situations in which governments "exercise[] power in acceptable ways."

Mittiga specifies further that FL:

...is bound up with a range of political capacities and actions including, among other things, being able to ensure continuous access to essential goods (particularly food, water, and shelter), prevent avoidable catastrophes, provide immediate and effective disaster relief, and combat invading forces or quell unjustified uprisings or rebellions. If a government cannot fulfill these basic security functions, it is not legitimate, if it is even a government at all. [p.3]

On the other hand, Mittiga acknowledges that there is "extensive debate" about which factors are relevant to CL, but argues that, "[a]mong the most commonly defended factors" are "the presence of democratic rights and processes, consent, guarantees of equal representation, provision of core public benefits, protection of basic individual rights and freedoms, social justice, and observance of fairness principles." [pp. 4–5] Mittiga specifies further that "[m]ost contemporary theorists maintain that legitimacy [in the contingent sense] requires multiple of these factors—some of which are procedural and others substantive."

According to Mittiga, what makes certain aspects of legitimacy "contingent" (as opposed to "foundational") is that they are affected by (1) "the problem of pluralism"—i.e., the idea that "any firm agreement on" which factor(s) matters (or matter most of all) "will remain elusive or at least always open to contestation and renegotiation"; (2) "the problem of partial displacement," which holds that "when new legitimation factors emerge," as they often have historically, "earlier ones may not entirely disappear but only become less salient, at least for sizable portions of the citizenry"; and (3) "the problem of exceptional circumstances," which is "the fact that even widely shared and seemingly stable CL factors are routinely relaxed or abandoned during emergencies, often without calling into question the basic legitimacy of the government."

Mittiga summarizes the difference between these two types or levels or types of legitimacy as follows:

The factors associated with CL condition the use of political power by specifying, for instance, what can or cannot be done or sacrificed, how decisions should be made, and who counts (and for how much). The answers to these questions often appear to us as moral universals; yet, in practice, they are the products of long and contentious historical processes. FL, on the other hand, does not vary between societies, generations, or circumstances. Ensuring safety and security is always the primary—though, in good states, under reasonably favorable conditions, not the exclusive—end of political power. Aristotle expresses something like this in insisting that the point of political society is to furnish the resources needed not just to live but to live well. Crudely put, FL is about living, CL about living well. And it is of course impossible to live well without living: after all, there can be no democracy of desolation, no fair social cooperation in conditions of extreme scarcity, no real rights when political stability is maintainable only through raw assertions of coercive power (if it can be maintained at all). In this sense, FL is necessarily prior to CL, and must be regarded as such in moments when trade-offs become a necessary part of the political calculus. [p.7]

== Sources ==
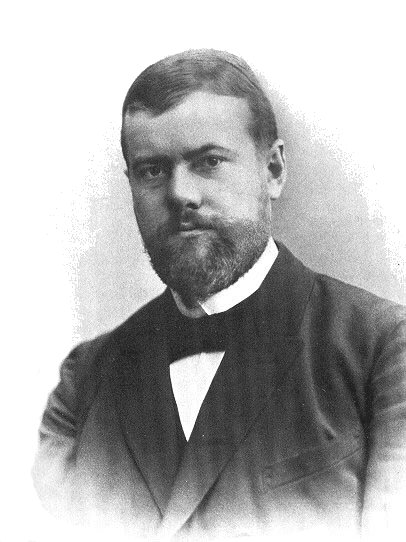
Max Weber, who argued that societies are politically cyclical

Max Weber proposed that societies behave cyclically in governing themselves with different types of governmental legitimacy. That democracy was unnecessary for establishing legitimacy, a condition that can be established with codified laws, customs, and cultural principles, not by means of popular suffrage. For Weber, a state is legitimate when its subjects regard it as having a valid claim to exercise power and authority.

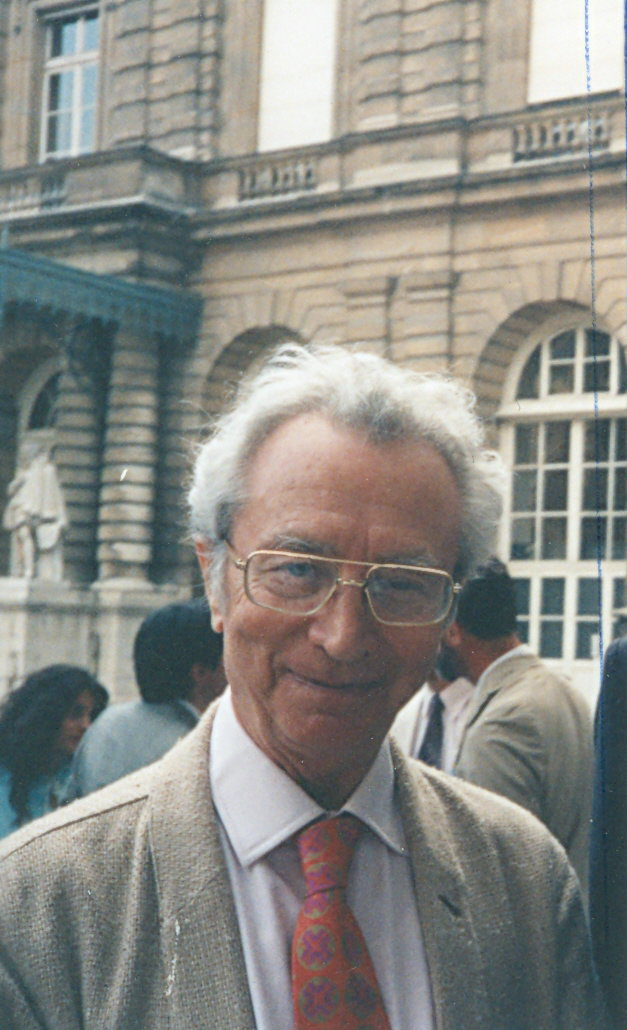
Mattei Dogan

The French political scientist Mattei Dogan's contemporary interpretation of Weber's types of political legitimacy (traditional, charismatic, legal-rational) proposes that they are conceptually insufficient to comprehend the complex relationships that constitute a legitimate political system in the 21st century. Moreover, Dogan proposed that traditional authority and charismatic authority are obsolete as forms of contemporary government; e.g., the Islamic Republic of Iran (est. 1979) rule by means of the priestly Koranic interpretations by the Ayatollah Ruhollah Khomeini.

== Forms of legitimate government ==
In determining the political legitimacy of a system of rule and government, the term proper—political legitimacy—is philosophically an essentially contested concept that facilitates understanding the different applications and interpretations of abstract, qualitative, and evaluative concepts such as "art", "social justice", et cetera, as applied in aesthetics, political philosophy, the philosophy of history, and the philosophy of religion. Therefore, in defining the political legitimacy of a system of government and rule, the term "essentially contested concept" indicates that a key term (communism, democracy, constitutionalism, etc.) has different meanings within a given political argument. Hence, the intellectually restrictive politics of dogmatism ("My answer is right, and all others are wrong"), scepticism ("I don't know what is true, and I even doubt my own opinion"), and eclecticism ("Each meaning gives a partial view, so the more meanings the better") are inappropriate philosophic stances for managing a political term that has more than one meaning (see Walter Bryce Gallie).

== See also ==
- An unjust law is no law at all
- Chinese legitimacy question
- Delegitimization
- Governance failure
- Justification for the state
- Legality
- Legitimacy (criminal law)
- Legitimacy of the NATO bombing of Yugoslavia
- Legitimacy of the State of Israel
- Legitimation
- Police legitimacy
- Political apathy
- Political efficacy
- Rule according to higher law
- Rule of law
