= Anarchism Today =

1971 book

- Editors: David E. Apter, James Joll
- Subject: Anarchism
- Publisher: Macmillan Press
- Publication date: 1971
- Pages: 237

Anarchism Today is a 1971 book on the connection between the 1960s New Left and classical anarchism. Edited by David E. Apter and James Joll, it was published by Macmillan Press in 1971.

== Bibliography ==
- Ashplant, T. G. (1973). "Review of Anarchism Today". New Blackfriars. 54 (634): 138–139. doi:10.1017/S0028428900043705. ISSN 0028-4289. JSTOR 43245907.
- Dillon, Michael R. (1974). "The Perennial Appeal of Anarchism". Polity. 7 (2): 234–247. doi:10.2307/3234374. ISSN 0032-3497. JSTOR 3234374. S2CID 222427990.
- O'Donnell, L. A. (1973). "Review of Anarchism Today". Journal of Economic Issues. 7 (1): 154–157. doi:10.1080/00213624.1973.11503091. ISSN 0021-3624. JSTOR 4224208.
- Rothman, Stanley (1974). "Review of Anarchism Today". The American Political Science Review. 68 (3): 1346–1347. doi:10.2307/1959211. ISSN 0003-0554. JSTOR 1959211. S2CID 147743339.
