= The Second International, 1889–1914 =

1956 book by James Joll

- Title page for The Second International, 1889–1914
- Author: James Joll
- Subject: History of socialism
- Publisher: Praeger Publishing
- Publication date: 1956
- Pages: 213
- OCLC: 2152690
- Dewey Decimal: 335.422
- LC Class: HX11.I5 J6

The Second International, 1889–1914 is a 1956 history book about the Second International written by historian James Joll.

== Bibliography ==
- Bowditch, John (1958). "Review of Histoire du Mouvement Anarchiste en France, 1880-1914; The Second International, 1889-1914". The Journal of Economic History. 18 (3): 369–370. ISSN 0022-0507. JSTOR 2114225.
- Deane, Herbert A. (1957). "Review of The Second International, 1889-1914. Parts I and II". Political Science Quarterly. 72 (1): 129–131. doi:10.2307/2145367. ISSN 0032-3195. JSTOR 2145367.
- Deutscher, Isaac (1956). "Review of The Second International, 1889-1914". International Affairs. 32 (1): 88–89. doi:10.2307/2607856. ISSN 0020-5850. JSTOR 2607856.
- Kautsky, John H. (December 1957). "The Second International, 1889–1914. By James Joll". American Political Science Review. 51 (4): 1155–1156. doi:10.1017/S0003055400277873. ISSN 1537-5943.
- Matteodo, Eugene A. (1957). "Review of The Second International: 1889-1914". Journal of International Affairs. 11 (1): 92. ISSN 0022-197X. JSTOR 24355730.
- Niemeyer, Gerhart (1958). "The Slow Death of Socialism". The Review of Politics. 20 (4): 698–701. ISSN 0034-6705. JSTOR 1404877.
- Pelling, Henry (1956). "Review of The Second International, 1889–1914". History. 41 (141/143): 265–266. ISSN 0018-2648. JSTOR 24402984.
- Rubinstein, Alvin Z. (1957). "Review of The Second International, 1889-1914". The Annals of the American Academy of Political and Social Science. 311: 215. ISSN 0002-7162. JSTOR 1032425.
- Sturmthal, Adolf (1975). "Review of The Second International 1889-1914". The Journal of Economic History. 35 (3): 671–672. ISSN 0022-0507. JSTOR 2119581.
- Warth, Robert D. (1957). "Review of The Second International, 1889-1914". The Journal of Modern History. 29 (2): 146. ISSN 0022-2801. JSTOR 1872251.
