= Environment (magazine) =

Journal

- Editor-in-Chief & Executive Editors: Steven Kolmes, Franz Baumann, Ralph Hamann, Myanna Lahsen, Miriam Matejova, Alan H. McGowan, Oladele Ogunseitan, Timothy O'Riordan
- Categories: Environment, Environmental policy
- Frequency: Bimonthly
- Circulation: 3,100
- Founder: Barry Commoner
- Founded: 1958
- Company: Taylor & Francis
- Based in: Philadelphia
- Website: environmentmagazine.org
- ISSN: 0013-9157
- OCLC: 476415628

Environment: Science and Policy for Sustainable Development, commonly referred to as Environment magazine, is published bi-monthly in Philadelphia by Taylor & Francis. Environment is a hybrid, peer-reviewed, popular environmental science publication and website, aimed at a broad, "smart, but uninitiated" population. Its Editor-in-Chief is Steven Kolmes (University of Portland) and Executive Editors are Franz Baumann (Academic Council on the United Nations System (ACUNS)), Ralph Hamann (Graduate School of Business, University of Cape Town, Cape Town, South Africa), Myanna Lahsen (Linköping University, Linköping, Sweden, Earth System Science Center, Brazilian National Institute for Space Research, São José dos Campos, São Paulo, Brazil), Miriam Matejova (Department of Political Science, Faculty of Social Studies, Masaryk University, Brno, Czechia), Alan H. McGowan (The New School), Oladele Ogunseitan (University of California, Irvine), Tim O'Riordan (University of East Anglia).

== History ==
Environment was founded in the late 1950s as Nuclear Information, a mimeographed newsletter published by Barry Commoner at the Center for the Biology of Natural Systems, at Washington University, in St. Louis, Missouri. It was renamed Scientist and Citizen from 1964-1968. From 1973 it was published by the Scientist's Institute for Public Information (SIPI) chaired by Margaret Mead, and later by a small commercial publisher.

Its full title, Environment: Science and Policy for Sustainable Development helps to distinguish it from other journals including Environments published by MDPI and The Environment published by the Chartered Institution of Water and Environmental Management (CIWEM).

== Academic recognition ==
The journal has a Scopus citescore index of 6.2 in 2024, giving it a ranking of 56th out of 279 journals listed in the category 'Water Science and Technology' and 115/297 in 'Renewable Energy, Sustainability and the Environment' and 68/219 in 'Environmental Science - Environmental Engineering' and 42/125 in 'Environmental Science - Global and Planetary Change'. These are relatively low because Scopus counts citations of articles in the journal in academic literature over the previous three years, and this journal is not a fully academic publication. Also, it is a hybrid publication.

The journal has an Impact Factor of 3.9, with rankings of 136/374 in environmental sciences and 59/191 in environmental studies.

Highly cited articles per year include:

- Hansen, J. E., Kharecha, P., Sato, M., Tselioudis, G., Kelly, J., Bauer, S. E., … Pokela, A. (2025). Global Warming Has Accelerated: Are the United Nations and the Public Well-Informed? Environment: Science and Policy for Sustainable Development, 67(1), 6–44.
- Rees, W. E., & Wackernagel, M. (2023). Ecological Footprint Accounting: Thirty Years and Still Gathering Steam. Environment: Science and Policy for Sustainable Development, 65(5), 5–18. https://doi.org/10.1080/00139157.2023.2225405https://doi.org/10.1080/00139157.2025.2434494
- Nisbet, M.C. 2009. Communicating Climate Change Why Frames Matter for Public Engagement. ENVIRONMENT 51(2): 12-23.
- Gardner, G.T. and Stern, P.C.2008. The short list - The most effective actions US households can take to curb climate change. ENVIRONMENT 50(5): 12-24.
- Dunlap, R.E. and McCright, A.M. 2008. A widening gap - Republican and Democratic views on climate change. ENVIRONMENT50(5): 26-35.
