= The Anarchists (book) =

1964 history book by James Joll

- Author: James Joll
- Subject: History of anarchism
- Published: 1964 (Little, Brown and Company)
- Pages: 303
- OCLC: 65683373

The Anarchists is a 1964 history book about the history of anarchism by James Joll.
