= George Ramsay (historian) =

Irish historian (1909–1992)

George Ramsay FBA
- Born: George Daniel Ramsay; 25 May 1909
- Died: 11 June 1992 (aged 83)
- Occupation: Historian

George Daniel Ramsay, FBA (25 May 1909 – 11 June 1992) was an Irish historian. He was a tutor (from 1937) and fellow (from 1938) of St Edmund Hall, Oxford, until he retired in 1974. He was elected a fellow of the British Academy in 1990.

== Publications ==
- The Wiltshire Woollen Industry in the Sixteenth and Seventeenth Centuries, Oxford Historical Monographs (Oxford: Oxford University Press, 1943)
- (Editor) Two Wiltshire Tax Lists, 1545 and 1576, Wiltshire Archaeological and Natural History Society, Records Series, vol. 10 (Devizes: Wiltshire Record Society, 1954)
- English Overseas Trade during the Centuries of Emergence: Studies in Some Modern Origins of the English-speaking World (London: Macmillan, 1957)
- (Editor) John Isham, Mercer and Merchant Adventurer: Two Account Books of a London Merchant in the Reign of Elizabeth I, Publications of Northamptonshire Record Society, vol. 21 (Gateshead: Northumberland Press, 1962)
- The City of London in International Politics at the Accession of Elizabeth Tudor (Manchester: Manchester University Press, 1975)
- The Queen's Merchants and the Revolt of the Netherlands (Manchester: Manchester University Press, 1986)
