= Peter Wiles =

British economist (1919–1997)

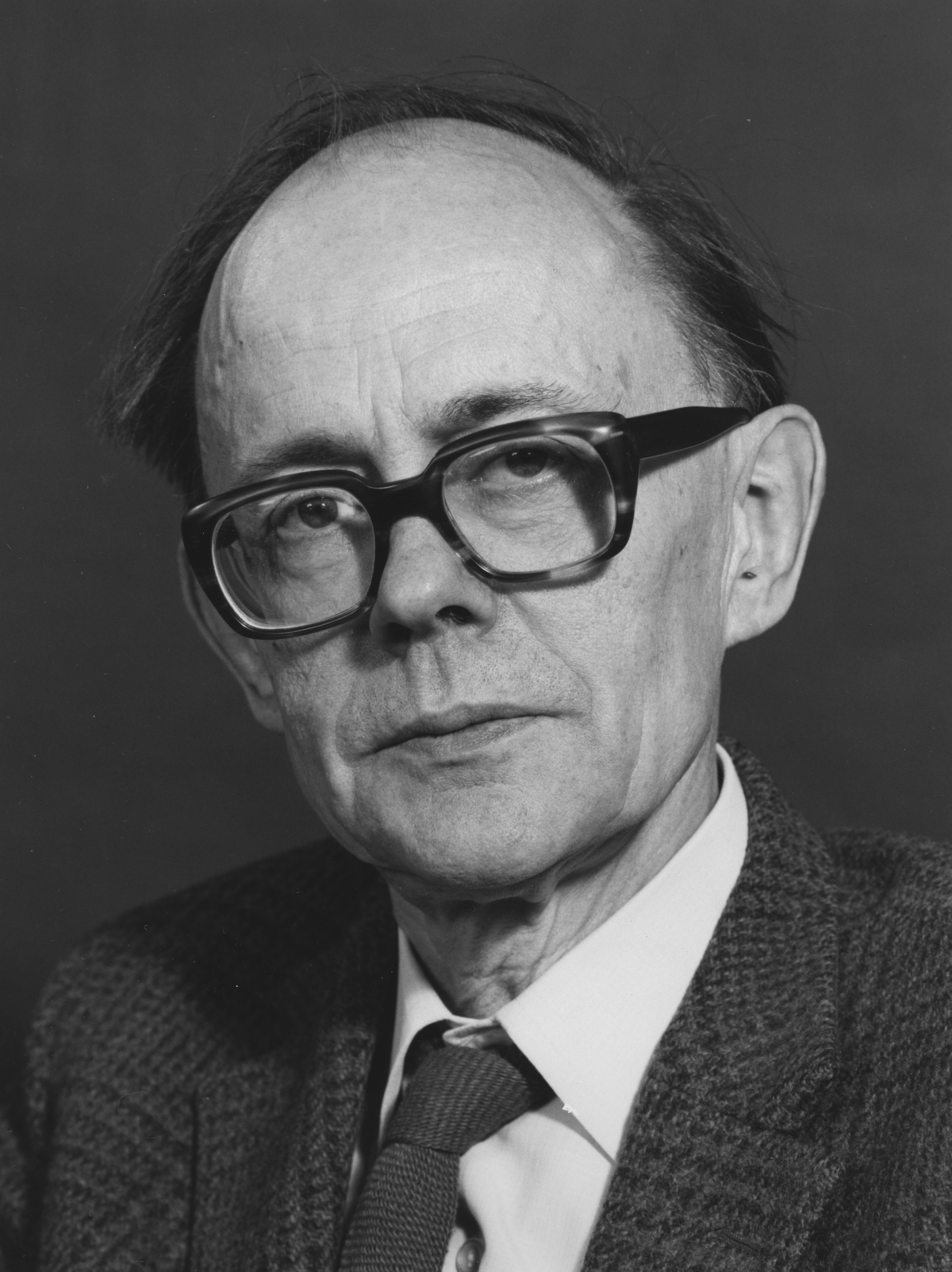
Image of Professor Peter Wiles

Peter John de la Fosse Wiles, FBA (25 November 1919 – 11 July 1997) was a British comparative economist. He was professor of Russian social and economic studies at the University of London from 1965 to 1985, having previously been an Examination Fellow at All Souls College, Oxford (1947 to 1948), a fellow of New College, Oxford (1948 to 1960) and a professor at Brandeis University (1960 to 1963). He was elected a fellow of the British Academy in 1990.

His maternal grandfather was the colonial administrator and university official Sir Claude de la Fosse; his father's brother was the civil servant Sir Harold Wiles, whose son was the theologian Maurice Wiles (whose own son is the mathematician Sir Andrew Wiles).

== Publications ==
- Price, Cost and Output (Oxford: Basil Blackwell, 1956)
- The Political Economy of Communism (Oxford: Basil Blackwell, 1962)
- Communist International Economics (Oxford: Basil Blackwell, 1968)
- Economic Institutions Compared (Oxford: Basil Blackwell, 1977)
