= Woman with a Mandolin =

Painting by Georges Braque

- Femme tenant une Mandoline (French)
- Artist: Georges Braque
- Year: 1910
- Medium: Oil on canvas
- Movement: Analytic cubism
- Dimensions: 92 cm × 73 cm (36 in × 29 in)
- Location: Thyssen-Bornemisza Museum, Madrid

Woman with a Mandolin is an oil-on-canvas painting by French artist Georges Braque, created in 1910. The painting is in the Thyssen-Bornemisza Museum, in Madrid.

== History and description ==
Braque made this painting in the spring of 1910 and it belongs to his analytical cubism phase. He was probably influenced to create paintings in this style by an exhibition of Camille Corot at the Salon d'Automne of 1909, which he visited with his friend Pablo Picasso. The work of Corot inspired him to create works in which living models would be connected to musical instruments—in this case, a mandolin. The artist returned finally to the depiction of the human figure, after two years entirely devoted to landscapes and still lifes. Musical instruments became a typical feature in cubist paintings. The painting was made in the oval shape, and its believed to have been the first cubist painting made in this format.
