= Kenneth Dyson =

British academic

Kenneth Dyson is a British academic specialising in politics. He is a Distinguished Research Professor at the School of European Studies at Cardiff University, having previously been Professor of European Studies and Co-Director of the European Briefing Unit at the University of Bradford.

== Career and research ==
In 1982, Dyson was appointed Professor of European Studies at Bradford University, he held this post until 2002. Since 2004, he has worked at Cardiff University, from 2004 to 2015, he was Distinguished Research Professor in Cardiff University's School of European Studies. Since then, he has been a Visiting Research Professor at Cardiff University.

Dyson's main research interests include European state tradition, comparative and historical political economy, European integration, German studies, and Economic and monetary union. His more recent research has primarily focused on the historical evolution of European macro-economic governance and politics, where he has concentrated on the significance of the euro in European integration. He has written ten books about this research.

In 2016, Dyson completed an international research project titled Architects of the Euro: Intellectuals in the Making of European Monetary Union (OUP). He led this project alongside Ivo Maes from the National Bank of Belgium. His research projects have been funded by the European Commission, European Central Bank, National Bank of Belgium, Fondation Pierre Werner and the Robert Triffin Foundation.

== Awards and honours ==
- Elected Fellow of the British Academy in 1997
- Academician of the Learned Societies of the Social Sciences
- Fellow of the Royal Historical Society
- Founding Fellow of the Learned Society of Wales in 2010

== Selected works ==
- Dyson, Kenneth (2021). Conservative Liberalism, Ordo-Liberalism, and the State: Disciplining Democracy and the Market. Oxford: Oxford University Press. ISBN 978-0-19-885428-9
- Dyson, Kenneth (2014). States, Debt and Power: 'Saints' and 'Sinners' in European History and Integration. Oxford: Oxford University Press. ISBN 978-0-19-871407-1
- Dyson, Kenneth; Featherstone, Kevin (1999). The Road to Maastricht: Negotiating Economic and Monetary Union. Oxford: Oxford University Press. ISBN 978-0-19-829638-6
- Dyson, Kenneth (2010). The State Tradition in Western Europe. Colchester: ECPR Press ISBN 978-0-9558203-5-9
- Dyson, Kenneth; Goetz, Klaus (eds) (2003). Germany, Europe and the Politics of Constraint. Oxford: Oxford University Press. ISBN 978-0-19-726295-5
- Dyson, Kenneth (2000). The Politics of the Euro-Zone: Stability or Breakdown? Oxford: Oxford University Press. ISBN 978-0-19-924165-1
