= Christopher Green (art historian) =

British art historian (born 1943)

Christopher Kenneth Green, FBA (born 1943) is a British art historian, who was professor of the History of Art at the Courtauld Institute of Art between 1991 and 2008.

== Early life ==
Christopher Kenneth Green was born in 1943, the second son of Frederic Ray Hilton Green, a civil servant with the Colonial Office who served as Inspector of Mines in Kenya and later lived at Epsom Downs, Surrey. He was educated at Christ's College, Cambridge, graduating in 1966 with a Bachelor of Arts (BA) degree. Thereafter, he completed a Master of Arts (MA) degree at the University of London in 1973. Green was awarded a Doctor of Philosophy (PhD) degree by the Courtauld Institute of Art, University of London, for his thesis "Fernand Léger and the Parisian avant-garde, 1909–1921", supervised by the artist and writer John Golding.

== Career ==
Green's first curatorial work was with Golding for the Tate exhibition Léger and Purist Paris in 1970. He remained at the Courtauld as a lecturer after completing his PhD and was later appointed a reader there. In 1991, the Institute appointed him Professor of the History of Art, a post he held until his retirement in 2008. Photographs attributed to Green are held in the Conway Library at The Courtauld Institute of Art, London, whose archive, of primarily architectural images, is being digitised under the wider Courtauld Connects project. For the 1997–8 academic year, he was a Leverhulme Research Fellow, and between 2001 and 2010, he was trustee of National Museums Liverpool.

Green curated the Juan Gris exhibition at the Whitechapel Gallery in 1992, the Roger Fry exhibition at the Courtauld Institute in 1999, the Henri Rousseau exhibition at the Tate Modern in Paris and Washington in 2005, the Picasso exhibition in Barcelona in 2008, the Modern Antiquity exhibition at the J. Paul Getty Museum in 2011 and, most recently, the Mondrian–Nicholson exhibition at the Courtauld in 2012.

=== Publications ===
Green's major works include:

- Léger and the Avant-Garde (Yale University Press, 1976).
- Cubism and its Enemies: Modern Movements and Reaction in French Art 1916–28 (Yale University Press, 1987).
- Art in France 1900–1940 (Yale University Press, 2000).
- Picasso: Architecture and Vertigo (Yale University Press, 2005).

=== Honours ===
In 1999, Green was elected a fellow of the British Academy, the United Kingdom's national academy for the humanities and social sciences.

== Personal life ==
In 1968, Green married Charlotte Hannah (born 1944), younger daughter of Lt-Col. Oliver Robert Marne Sebag-Montefiore (1915–1993), OBE, who was president of the Jewish Welfare Board. They have two children: one son and one daughter.
