= Peter Brand (academic) =

Charles Peter Brand, FBA (7 February 1923 – 4 November 2016), commonly known as Peter Brand, was a British scholar of Italian studies and a university administrator. He was the Professor of Italian at the University of Edinburgh from 1966 to 1988 and the university's vice-principal from 1984 to 1988.

== Early life ==
Born on 7 February 1923, Brand attended Trinity Hall, Cambridge; he joined the college in 1941, but his studies were interrupted by service in the Second World War (including in Italy). After demobilisation, he completed his BA in 1948. He was awarded a PhD in 1952 for a study on Italianate fashion in 19th-century England supervised by E. R. Vincent.

== Career ==
Brand, briefly, an assistant lecturer at the University of Edinburgh in 1952, before he returned to Cambridge to take up an assistant lectureship in Italian in 1952; he was promoted to a full lectureship in 1957, which he held until 1966. In the meantime, Brand was also elected a fellow of Trinity Hall in 1958. He left Cambridge in 1966 to succeeded Mario Manlio Rossi as Professor of Italian at the University of Edinburgh, remaining in the chair until 1988. He developed the department into "one of the foremost units of Italian studies in the UK". After serving as dean of the Faculty of Arts, he was also Vice-Principal of the University of Edinburgh from 1984 to 1988.

The Scotsman called Brand "one of Britain’s outstanding scholars of Italian literature in the second half of the 20th century". He served as general editor of the Modern Language Review from 1971 to 1978. He was elected a fellow of the British Academy in 1990 and in 1995 he served as president of the Modern Humanities Research Association. He was appointed Cavaliere (Knight) of the Order of Merit of the Italian Republic in 1975 and promoted to Commendatore (Commander) in 1988. He was the subject of a festschrift, Martin McLaughlin (ed.), Britain and Italy from Romanticism to Modernism: A Festschrift for Peter Brand (Oxford: Legenda, 2000).

== Publications ==
- Italy and the English Romantics: the Italianate Fashion in Early Nineteenth-Century England (Cambridge: Cambridge University Press, 1957).
- (edited with Kenelm Foster and Uberto Limentani) Italian Studies Presented to E. R. Vincent on His Retirement from the Chair of Italian at Cambridge (Cambridge: Heffer, 1962).
- Torquato Tasso: A Study of the Poet and of his Contribution to English Literature (Cambridge: Cambridge University Press, 1965).
- Ariosto: A Preface to the "Orlando Furioso", Writers of Italy (Edinburgh: Edinburgh University Press, 1974)
- (edited with Lino Pertile) The Cambridge History of Italian Literature (Cambridge: Cambridge University Press, 1996).
- (with Richard Andrews and Corinna Salvadori) Overture to the Opera: Italian Pastoral Drama in the Renaissance: Poliziano’s Orfeo and Tasso’s Aminta with Facing English Verse Translations (Dublin: UCD Foundations for Italian Studies, 2013).
