= Tim O'Riordan =

British geographer

Tim O'Riordan OBE DL FBA (born 21 February 1942) is a British geographer who is Emeritus Professor of Environmental Sciences at the University of East Anglia (UEA) and a prominent British environmental writer and thinker.

== Background ==
O'Riordan grew up in the north of England, and was educated at the University of Edinburgh (MA, Geography), Cornell University (MS, Water Resources Engineering), and King's College, Cambridge (PhD in Geography).

He taught at Simon Fraser University in Canada in the late 1960s, before talking up a lectureship at UEA. He retired as Professor in 2005.

He was a founder and deputy director (1991-) of the Centre for Social and Economic Research on the Global Environment (CSERGE) at UEA.

He was widowed and has two daughters and lives in Norwich.

== Contributions ==
O'Riordan's contributions are to environmental policy analysis; environmental appraisal and evaluation; and environmental governance and decision-making. In 1981 he published Environmentalism, one of the first critical summaries of the field. Latterly he has worked on interdisciplinary approaches pursuing the transition to sustainability, becoming active in the development of sustainability science partnerships. In 2014 he called for a "science for sustainable development which is geared to compassion, fairness, empathy, and social justice." For him, "Sustainability is not a word but a way of becoming." His work has been cited over 16,500 times.

His engaged and more practical work relates to designing future coastlines in East Anglia in England so that they are ready for sea level rise and the creation of sound economies and societies for a sustainable future, using participatory democratic decisionmaking; he has worked in Broadland since the late 1960s.

O'Riordan has edited a number of books on the institutional aspects of global environmental change, and policy and practice, including two editions of the textbook, Environmental Science for Environmental Management. His work on European environmental policy and risk management is summarised in several volumes. He is editor of the prominent magazine/journal Environment.

He has worked on the greening of business, participating in the Prince of Wales' seminar on Business and the Environment, and has sat on several advisory boards including the Corporate Responsibility Body for Asda plc, and the Growth and Climate Change Panel for Anglian Water Group. He was a member of the UK Sustainable Development Commission until it was closed down by the government in 2011.

== Awards ==
- Order of the British Empire (2010)
- Fellow of the British Academy (1999)
- Distinguished Friend of Oxford (2013)
- Deputy Lieutenant of the County of Norfolk
- Sheriff of Norwich (2009–10)

== Publications ==
- O'Riordan, T. and T. Lenton (eds.). 2013. Addressing Tipping Points for a Precarious Future. Oxford University Press/British Academy.
- Horlick-Jones, T., Walls, J., Rowe, G., Pidgeon, N., Poortinga, W., Murdock, G., O'Riordan, T., (2007) The GM Debate: Risks, Politics and Public Engagement. Routledge.
- O’Riordan, T. and S. Stoll-Kleemann (eds.). 2002. Biodiversity, Sustainability and Human Communities: Protecting Beyond the Protected. Cambridge University Press.
- O’Riordan, T. (ed.) 2002. Globalism, Localism and Identity: New Perspectives on the Transition of Sustainability. Earthscan.
- O’Riordan, T., James Cameron, and Jordan, A.J. (eds.) 2001. Reinterpreting the Precautionary Principle. Cameron May, London.
- O’Riordan, T. (ed.) 1999). Environmental Science for Environmental Management, Revised Second Edition. Prentice Hall, Harlow Essex.
- O'Riordan, T. (ed.). 1997. Ecotaxation. Earthscan.
- O'Riordan, T. and H. Voisey (ed.). 1998. The Transition to Sustainability: the Politics of Agenda 21 in Europe. Earthscan.
- O'Riordan, T. and H. Voisey (ed.). 1997. Sustainable Development in Western Europe: Coming to Terms with Agenda 21. Frank Cass.
- Jager J. and T. O'Riordan (eds.). 1996. The Politics of Climate Change: A European Perspective. Routledge.
- O’Riordan, T. and J. Cameron (eds.). (1994). Interpreting the Precautionary Principle. Routledge.
- Pearce, D., Turner, R., O'Riordan, T.(1993) Blueprint III. Earthscan.
- Weale A., T O'Riordan, L. Kramme. 1992. Controlling Pollution in the round: Change and Choice in Environmental Regulation in Britain and Germany. London: Anglo-German Foundation.
- O'Riordan T., R. Kemp, M. Purdue 1988. Sizewell B: An Anatomy of Inquiry. Pergamon.
- Lowe, P., Cox, G., MacEwen, M., O'Riordan, T., Winter, M. 1986. Countryside conflicts. The politics of farming, forestry and conservation. Gower Publishing.
- O'Riordan, T., Turner, R. (eds.) 1983. Progress in Resource Management and Environmental Planning.
- O'Riordan, T., Turner, R. (eds.). 1983. Annotated Reader in Environmental Planning and Management. Pergamon Press.
- O'Riordan, T. 1981. Environmentalism. Pion.
- O'Riordan, T. and D. Sewell (eds.). 1981. Project Appraisal and Policy Review. Wiley.
- O'Riordan, T. and G. Padgett. 1978. Sharing rivers and canals: a study of the views of coarse anglers and boat users on selected waterways. Sports Council.
- O'Riordan, T. 1971. Perspectives on resource management. Pion.
