= Peter H. Brieger =

German art historian (1898–1983)

- Born: 30 June 1898; Breslau (Wrocław), Germany
- Died: 17 October 1983 (aged 85); Toronto, Canada
- Occupation: Professor of Art History

Academic background
- Education: University of Breslau
- Thesis: (1924, 1927)

Academic work
- Discipline: Art History
- Institutions: University of Breslau, Germany; University of Toronto, Canada

Peter H. Brieger (30 June 1898 – 17 October 1983) was a German art historian who immigrated to Canada in 1936 to escape persecution from the Nazi regime because of his Jewish family background. He taught at the University of Toronto from 1936 to 1969 and served as head of the Department of Fine Art from 1947 to 1964. He was a medievalist, specialising in 12th- and 13th-century manuscripts.

== Early life and education ==
Peter Brieger's father, Oskar Brieger, was an ENT specialist in Breslau (then in Prussia, now Wrocław in Poland). His mother was Hedwig Lion. He grew up as one of four children in a wealthy, cultured atmosphere surrounded by many books, and studied foreign languages with a tutor. Some of the furniture in his home was designed by the German architect, painter, and set designer Hans Poelzig. The family had a holiday home in the Riesengebirge, or Giant Mountains (now in the Czech Republic), where Oskar had a small theatre built for the family's own plays to be performed. As a child, Brieger attended the Maria-Magdalene High School in Breslau. After graduating from the school in 1916, he did military service in the First World War until 1918, and was wounded in Flanders.

From 1919 to 1924, Brieger studied art history, history, German literature and archaeology at the University of Breslau and the Ludwig-Maximilians-Universität München. His professors were the art historians Dagobert Frey, Franz Landsberger, Wilhelm Pinder, Heinrich Wölfflin and August Grisebach (1881–1950), under whose supervision he received his doctorate in Breslau in 1924: 'Zur Geschichte des Kunsturteils' ('On the history of art judgement', focusing on the travel diaries of Germans in Italy from 1550 to the period of Winckelmann and Goethe). In 1921, Brieger qualified to teach at secondary schools, and from 1922 to 1927, he worked as a university assistant in the Art History Department of the University of Wrocław. In 1927 and 1928, he received a research grant for the Bibliotheca Hertziana (now the Max Planck Institute for Art History) in Rome. His post-doctoral (habilitation) thesis (1927), which qualified him for a professorship, was published in Berlin in 1930 under the title Die deutsche Geschichtsmalerei des 19 Jahrhunderts (German History Painting of the 19th Century).

Peter Brieger married Barbara Ritter (1908–2000), a German historian, in 1931. The couple had two sons, Peter and Nick, who grew up in Canada.

== Professional life ==
From 1927 to 1933, Peter Brieger worked as a private lecturer at the University of Breslau; he was also assistant to his former supervisor Grisebach until 1930, and then to Frey until 1933. Grisebach thought highly of him, writing in a report in 1933 that “thanks to his solid scientific background [he] exercised an unusually fruitful teaching activity”, as well as noting his "responsible way of working" and "extraordinary pedagogical disposition". After spending a few months in Paris in 1933, he went on to London, where he worked in 1934 on a series of maps for archaeologists and art historians at the Courtauld Institute of Art, entitled the Atlas of Medieval Art and Architecture in England. He gave lectures at the Courtauld as one of several temporary faculty members, and contributed photographs to the Courtauld's Conway Library archive, which later underwent a digitisation project. It was this time he spent in London which resulted in a change of focus towards English medieval art and architecture, which was to continue for the rest of his life.

Brieger was dismissed from his teaching position in Breslau in 1934 because of his Jewish origins, and in 1935 his professorship qualification was revoked. He immigrated to England in 1936, and went on to Canada in the same year. From 1936 to 1969, Peter Brieger was a member of the newly established Department of Art at the University of Toronto, where he taught from 1936 to 1947 as a lecturer and associate professor. During the Second World War he contributed to the Allied war effort by helping to decipher German messages. From 1947 to 1969, Brieger was Professor and Chairman of the Department of Art at the University of Toronto. In 1964–1965 he was visiting professor at the Institute for Advanced Study in Princeton, and part-time professor at the Pontifical Institute of Mediaeval Studies in Toronto until 1973. He contributed to an exhibition, “Art and the Courts: France and England from 1259 to 1328”, which took place at the National Gallery of Canada in 1972. He has been recognised in Canada as a pioneer in Art History as an academic discipline, and was a founding president of the Universities Art Association of Canada from 1956 onwards. Since 1984 a Memorial Lecture Series has been held at the University of Toronto in his honour.

== Publications ==
=== Early articles (in German) ===
- [Review?], 'Die Fürstengruft von Grüssau' ['The Royal Crypt of Grüssau'], Grüssauer Bildhauer [Grüssau Sculptor] Anton Dorasil, von [by] Nikolaus von Lutterotti, 1925.
- Review, F Klopfer: 'Von der Seele der Baukunst: Wege zur Bildung' ['From the Soul of Architecture: Pathways to Education'], Zeitschrift für Ästhetik und allgemeine Kunstwissenschaft [Journal of Aesthetics and General Art History], 22, pp. 367–368, Dessau, 1928.
- Review, Ernst Mössel, 'Die Proportion in Antike und Mittelalter' ['Proportion in Antiquity and the Middle Ages'], Munich, 1926, Zeitschrift für Ästhetik und allgemeine Kunstwissenschaft [Journal of Aesthetics and General Art History], 22, pp. 519–520, 1928.

=== Books ===
- Die deutsche Geschichtsmalerei des 19 Jahrhunderts, Berlin: J J Augustus, 1930.
- England's contribution to the origin and development of the triumphal cross, Toronto: Pontifical Institute of Mediaeval Studies, 1942.
- Loan exhibition: 17th-18th century French masters, University of Western Ontario, McIntosh Art Gallery, 1953.
- English Art, 1216–1307, Oxford: Clarendon Press, 1957.

=== Books with co-authors ===
- Peter H. Brieger, G. Stephen Vickers and Frederick E. Winter, Art and Man, Book 1: Ancient and Medieval, Toronto: Holt, Rinehart and Winston, 1964.
- Peter H. Brieger, G. Stephen Vickers and Frederick E. Winter, Art and Man, Book 2: Renaissance and Baroque, Toronto: Holt, Rinehart and Winston, 1964.
- Peter H. Brieger, G. Stephen Vickers and Frederick E. Winter, Art and Man, Book 3: the Modern World, Toronto: Holt, Rinehart and Winston, 1964.
- Peter Brieger and Marthe Dulong, The Trinity College Apocalypse, London: Eugrammia Press,1967.
- Peter H. Brieger and T. S. R. Boase, The Oxford History of English Art, 4, English Art, 1216–1307, Oxford, Clarendon Press, 1968.
- Peter H. Brieger, Millard Meiss and Charles S. Singleton, Illuminated manuscripts of the Divine Comedy, Princeton University Press, 1969.
- Peter H. Brieger, Philippe Verdier and Marie Farquhar Montpetit, Art and the courts: France and England from 1259 to 1328: a checklist and illustrations of works in an exhibition, Ottawa: The National Gallery of Canada, 1972.

=== Cited in ===
- Matthew M. Reeve, Thirteenth-century Wall Painting of Salisbury Cathedral: Art, Liturgy, and Reform, Woodbridge: Boydell Press, 2008.
- John Munns, Cross and Culture in Anglo-Norman England: Theology, Imagery, Devotion, Woodbridge: Boydell Press, 2016.
