= Lorraine Tyler =

British cognitive neuroscientist and researcher

Lorraine Komisarjevsky Tyler
- Born: 1945 (age 80–81)
- Education: University of Leicester; University of Chicago
- Occupation: Neuroscientist

Lorraine Komisarjevsky Tyler FBA MAE, (b. 1945) is a British neuroscientist. She is Professor of Cognitive Neuroscience at the University of Cambridge.

== Biography ==
Tyler graduated with a BA in Psychology at the University of Leicester in 1966 and completed her PhD in Cognition and Communication at the University of Chicago in 1977. From 1980 to 1985, she was the senior scientist at the Max Planck Institute for Psycholinguistics before, in 1990, joining Birkbeck College as Professor of Psychology. In 1998 Tyler joined the University of Cambridge as a MRC Research Professor before taking up her current Professorship at the university in 2011. She also heads the Centre for Speech, Language, and the Brain in the department of psychology at Cambridge.

Tyler is a fellow or member of numerous learned societies. She was elected as a fellow of the British Academy in 1995. She was elected as a fellow of Clare College, Cambridge in 2000. Tyler was elected as a fellow of Academia Europaea in 2005 and of the Association for Psychological Science in 2009.

== Select publications ==
- Anastasia Klimovich-Gray, Lorraine K. Tyler, Billi Randall, Ece Kocagoncu, Barry Devereux and William D. Marslen-Wilson. 2019. "Research Articles, Behavioral/Cognitive Balancing Prediction and Sensory Input in Speech Comprehension: The Spatiotemporal Dynamics of Word Recognition in Context", Journal of Neuroscience 39 (3), 519-527. doi:10.1523/JNEUROSCI.3573-17.2018
- Kamen A. Tsvetanov, Zheng Ye, Laura Hughes, David Samu, Matthias S. Treder, Noham Wolpe, Lorraine K. Tyler, James B. Rowe and for the Cambridge Centre for Ageing and Neuroscience. 2018. "Activity and Connectivity Differences Underlying Inhibitory Control Across the Adult Life Span", Journal of Neuroscience 38 (36), 7887-7900 doi:10.1523/JNEUROSCI.2919-17.2018
- Karen L Campbell and Lorraine K Tyler. 2018. "Language-related domain-specific and domain-general systems in the human brain", Current Opinion in Behavioral Sciences 21, 132-137.
- Brian C.J. Moore, Lorraine K Tyler and William Marslen-Wilson. 2008. "Introduction. The perception of speech: from sound to meaning", Philosophical Transactions of the Royal Society B 363, 917–921. doi:10.1098/rstb.2007.2195
