= Richard Gray (literary scholar) =

British literary scholar (born 1944)

- Born: 1944 (age 81–82)
- Occupations: Literary scholar; professor emeritus
- Awards: C. Hugh Holman Award (1987); Fellow of the British Academy (1993)

Academic background
- Education: St Catharine's College, Cambridge

Academic work
- Discipline: American literature
- Institutions: University of Essex (1969–2015)
- Notable works: Writing the South (1986)

Richard John Gray, FBA (born 1944) is a British literary scholar specialising in American literature. He was professor of literature at the University of Essex from 1990 to 2015.

== Career ==
After completing his undergraduate degree and PhD at St Catharine's College, Cambridge, he was appointed a lecturer at the University of Essex in 1969; he remained there for the rest of his career, being promoted to senior lecturer (1976) and reader (1981) before his appointment to a professorship. He was elected a fellow of the British Academy in 1993.

Gray has been a distinguished visiting professor at several universities in the United States, including the University of Georgia and the University of South Carolina, He was associate editor of the Journal of American Studies in 1990 and became its editor in 1997, In 1987 his book ''Writing the South'' (1986) received the C. Hugh Holman Award from the Society for the Study of Southern Literature. In 2016 he was awarded a Leverhulme Trust Emeritus Research Professorship. He is currently completing a project titled Speaking the Unspeakable: American Writers and the Writing of Trauma.

== Publications ==
- The Literature of Memory: Modern Writers of the American South (Baltimore, MD: Johns Hopkins University Press, 1977)
- Writing the South: Ideas of an American Region, Cambridge Studies in American Literature and Culture, vol. 19 (Cambridge: Cambridge University Press, 1986)
- American Poetry of the Twentieth Century (New York, NY: Longman, 1990)
- The Life of William Faulkner: A Critical Biography (Oxford: Blackwell, 1994)
- Southern Aberrations: Writers of the American South and the Problems of Regionalism (Baton Rouge, LA: Louisiana State University Press, 2000)
- A History of American Literature (1st end, Oxford: Blackwell, 2004; 2nd edn, Chichester: Wiley-Blackwell, 2012)
- A Web of Words: The Great Dialogue of Southern Literature (Athens, GA: University of Georgia Press, 2007)
- After the Fall: American Literature Since 9/11, Blackwell Manifestos (Chichester: Wiley-Blackwell, 2011)
- A Brief History of American Literature (Chichester: Wiley-Blackwell, 2011)
- A History of American Poetry (Chichester: Wiley-Blackwell, 2015)
