= T. S. Willan =

British economic historian (1935 – 1994)

Thomas Stuart Willan, FBA (29 September 1935 – 4 June 1994) was a British economic historian. From 1961 to 1973 he was the Professor of Economic History at the University of Manchester, where he had earlier been an assistant lecturer (1935–45), lecturer (1945–47), senior lecturer (1947–49) and reader (1949–61). He was elected a fellow of the British Academy in 1991 and was the subject of a festschrift: W. H. Chaloner and B. M. Ratcliffe (eds), Trade and Transport: Essays in Economic History in Honour of T. S. Willan (Manchester: Manchester University Press, 1977).

== Publications ==
- River Navigation in England, 1600–1750 (Oxford: Oxford University Press, 1936)
- The English Coasting Trade, 1600–1750 (Manchester: Manchester University Press, 1938)
- The Muscovy Merchants of 1555 (Manchester: Manchester University Press, 1953)
- The Early History of the Russia Company, 1553–1603 (Manchester: Manchester University Press, 1956)
- Studies in Elizabethan Foreign Trade (Manchester: Manchester University Press, 1959)
- A Tudor Book of Rates (Manchester: Manchester University Press, 1962)
- The Early History of the Don Navigation (Manchester: Manchester University Press, 1965)
- An Eighteenth-Century Shopkeeper: Abraham Dent of Kirkby Stephen (Manchester: Manchester University Press, 1970)
- The Inland Trade: Studies in English Internal Trade in the Sixteenth and Seventeenth Centuries (Manchester: Manchester University Press, 1976)
- Elizabethan Manchester, Publications of the Chetham Society, 3rd Series, vol. 27 (Manchester: Manchester University Press for the Chetham Society, 1980).
