= Maurice FitzGerald Scott =

Irish economist (1924–2009)

Maurice FitzGerald Scott, FBA (6 December 1924 – 2 March 2009) was an Irish economist.

== Early life ==
Born at Kingstown, Ireland, on 6 December 1924, Scott was the son of Colonel Gerald Chaplin Scott Scott, OBE, and his wife, Harriet Mary Geraldine Scott, née FitzGerald. His maternal grandfather was the physicist George Francis FitzGerald. Scott's upbringing was peripatetic: when he was a boy, the family moved with Colonel Scott's military posting to British India, before they relocated to the Isle of Man; after home-schooling, he went schools in Windermere and then Belfast. He entered the Royal Engineers in 1943, but the war ended before he was able to see action though he was posted to Burma to oversee its post-war occupation.

== Academia ==
On demobilisation in 1946, Scott went to Wadham College, Oxford, where he read PPE and graduated with a Bachelor of Arts degree (BA). He subsequently completed a BLitt degree at Nuffield College, Oxford, under Norman Chester's supervision.

From 1949 to 1951, he worked at the OEEC in Paris under his former tutor, Donald MacDougal. He then followed MacDougal to the civil service, where he worked in prime minister's Statistical Section (1951 to 1953) and was then in the Economic Section of the Cabinet Office (1953 to 1954). Scott then worked as a research assistant at the National Institute of Economic and Social Research at Cambridge until 1957, when he became a tutor and student (i.e., fellow) at Christ Church, Oxford, serving until 1968. In 1968, he was elected an official fellow in economics at Nuffield College, where he remained until he retired in 1992. He died on 2 March 2009.

== Publications ==
- A Study of United Kingdom Imports (Cambridge: Cambridge University Press, 1963)
- (with Ian Little and Tibor Scitovsky) Industry and Trade in Some Developing Countries (London: Oxford University Press, 1970)
- (with J. D. MacArthur and D. M. G. Newbery) Project Appraisal in Practice: The Little–Mirrlees Method Applied in Kenya (London: Heinemann, 1976)
- (with R. A. Laslett) Can We Get back to Full Employment? (London: Macmillan, 1978)
- (with W. M. Corden and I. M. D. Little) The Case against General Import Restrictions, Thames Essay Series, vol. 24 (London: Trade Policy Research Centre 1980)
- A New View of Economic Growth (Oxford: Clarendon Press, 1989)
- Peter's Journey: A Young Man's Search for the True Purpose of Life (London: Janus Publishing Co., 1998)
