= Foundation Mattei Dogan =

French foundation devoted to the social sciences

Foundation Mattei Dogan is located in Paris, France, and is devoted exclusively to the social sciences. The foundation is recognized by the French and American governments as a non-profit organization. It offers 19 prizes in various disciplines, including sociology, demography, psychology, geography and political science, and gives priority to comparative research and interdisciplinary research. These prizes are offered in partnership with various institutions, including the Centre National de Recherche Scientifique (CNRS), the International Sociological Association (ISA), and the Maison des Sciences de l'Homme (MSH).

It was founded 2001 by the sociologist Mattei Dogan, to promote the “study the major issues of advanced societies – or post-industrial – from a comparative and interdisciplinary perspective by methods practiced in the social sciences.” Since its establishment, in addition to awarding prizes, it has organized conferences and published a book in partnership with the Russell Sage Foundation and the Social Science Research Council.
