= San Giorgio =

San Giorgio is the Italian form of Saint George. When used as the name of a person it is frequently contracted to Sangiorgio.

== Buildings ==
Churches bearing this dedication include:

- Duomo of San Giorgio, Ragusa, Sicily
- Pieve di San Giorgio, Argenta
- San Giorgio, Siena, Siena
- San Giorgio al Palazzo, Milan
- San Giorgio Cathedral, Modica, mother church of Modica, province of Ragusa, Sicily
- San Giorgio dei Greci, Venice
- San Giorgio di Nogaro, Friuli-Venezia Giulia
- San Giorgio in Braida, Verona
- San Giorgio in Poggiale, Bologna, a deconsecrated church and now art and history library
- San Giorgio in Velabro, Rome
- San Giorgio, Brescia, Brescia, Lombardy
- San Giorgio, Portofino
- San Giorgio Maggiore (church), Venice

Other buildings with the name:

- Palazzo San Giorgio, Genoa
- San Giorgio Monastery, Venice
- Scuola di San Giorgio degli Schiavoni, a confraternity house in Venice

== Businesses ==
- Banco di San Giorgio (1987–2012), an Italian bank
- Bank of Saint George (Italian: Casa delle compere e dei banchi di San Giorgio), the oldest chartered bank, established in 1407
- San Giorgio pasta, founded in Lebanon, PA in 1914; acquired by Hershey Foods in 1966; acquired by Riviana Foods Inc. in 2017.

== People ==
People with the name San Giorgio or Sangiorgio include:

- Abbondio Sangiorgio (1798–1879), a Milanese sculptor
- Eusebio da San Giorgio (c. 1470 – c. 1550), an Italian painter
- Giovanni Antonio Sangiorgio (died 1509), Italian canon lawyer and Cardinal of Alessandria
- The Master of the Antiphonal Q of San Giorgio Maggiore (active between 1440 and 1470), an Italian painter of illuminated manuscripts

== Places ==
=== Comuni ===
Many towns and villages are named after the saint, including the following communes (comuni), or municipalities:

- Carrara San Giorgio, one of two constituent municipalities of Due Carrare in the province of Padua
- Castel San Giorgio, in the province of Salerno
- Monforte San Giorgio, in the province of Messina
- Porto San Giorgio, in the province of Fermo
- San Giorgio a Cremano, in the province of Napoli
- San Giorgio a Liri, in the province of Frosinone
- San Giorgio Albanese, in the province of Cosenza
- San Giorgio Bigarello, in the province of Mantova
- San Giorgio Canavese, in the province of Torino
- San Giorgio del Sannio, in the province of Benevento
- San Giorgio della Richinvelda, in the province of Pordenone
- San Giorgio delle Pertiche, in the province of Padova
- San Giorgio di Lomellina, in the province of Pavia
- San Giorgio di Nogaro, in the province of Udine
- San Giorgio di Pesaro, in the province of Pesaro e Urbino
- San Giorgio di Piano, in the province of Bologna
- San Giorgio in Bosco, in the province of Padova
- San Giorgio Ionico, in the province of Taranto
- San Giorgio La Molara, in the province of Benevento
- San Giorgio Lucano, in the province of Matera
- San Giorgio Monferrato, in the province of Alessandria
- San Giorgio Morgeto, in the province of Reggio Calabria
- San Giorgio Piacentino, in the province of Piacenza
- San Giorgio Scarampi, in the province of Asti
- San Giorgio su Legnano, in the province of Milano
- Torre San Giorgio, in the province of Cuneo

=== Frazione ===
- San Giorgio, Cascia, in the province of Perugia

=== Geography ===
- Monte San Giorgio, a Swiss mountain
- San Giorgio in Alga, an island of the Venetian lagoon
- San Giorgio Maggiore, an island in Venice

== Transportation ==
- San Giorgio-class cruiser, class of Italian armoured cruisers
- San Giorgio (Genoa Metro), a metro station on the Genoa Metro
- San Giorgio-class amphibious transport dock, an Italian Navy amphibious landing ship
- Viadotto Genova-San Giorgio, a viaduct in Genoa, Italy.

== Other ==
- Compagnia di San Giorgio, the name of several groups of 14th century Italian mercenaries
- San Giorgio Maggiore at Dusk, a 1908 oil painting by Claude Monet

== See also ==
- San Giorgio Maggiore (disambiguation)
