= San Giorgio Maggiore (disambiguation) =

San Giorgio Maggiore is one of the islands of Venice, Italy.

San Giorgio Maggiore may also refer to:

- San Giorgio Maggiore (church), Venice, a basilica church on the island
- San Giorgio Maggiore (Monet series), a series of Impressionist paintings of the island by Claude Monet
  - San Giorgio Maggiore at Dusk, one of the series
- San Giorgio Maggiore, Naples, a basilica church in Naples, Italy

== See also ==
- San Giorgio (disambiguation)
