= John Morosini =

Venetian abbot who founded the Monastery of St. George in Venice

The Blessed John Morosini, O.S.B., († 1012) was a Venetian abbot, who founded the noted Monastery of St. George in that city.

Morosoni was born in Venice and was a member of the illustrious Morosini family, who played a significant role in the city's history. At least one Morosini was elected as a Doge of Venice.

Little more is known of his personal life, other than that he became a Benedictine monk at the famous Monastery of Saint-Michel-de-Cuxa in the eastern Pyrenees of southern France. It was a major center of monastic reform during the 10th century.

In AD 982 Morosoni returned to his native city and requested of the current Doge, Tribuno Memmo, that the island of San Giorgio Maggiore be granted to him for the establishment of a monastery there. Memmo granted his request and expanded the island's land area to provide the foundations for the monastic complex.

He died in 1012. His cultus was never formally approved, but for centuries he has been traditionally referred to as "Blessed" within the Benedictine Order. His feast day is observed on February 5.

== See also ==
- San Giorgio Monastery
- Church of San Giorgio Maggiore
- San Giorgio Maggiore
