= Argenta, Emilia–Romagna =

Argenta Comune di Argenta
- Comune
- Comune di Argenta
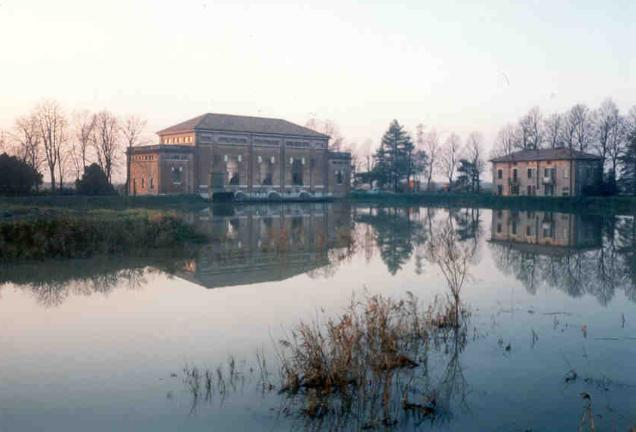
- Reclaimed land near Argenta.

- Flag Coat of arms

- Location of Argenta in Italy Argenta (Emilia-Romagna)
- Coordinates: 44°36′55″N 11°50′00″E
- Country: Italy
- Region: Emilia-Romagna
- Province: Ferrara (FE)
- Frazioni: Anita, Bando, Benvignante, Boccaleone, Campotto, Case Selvatiche, Consandolo, Filo, La Fiorana, Longastrino, Menata, Molino di Filo, Ospitale Monacale, San Biagio, San Nicolò, Santa Maria Codifiume, Traghetto

Government
  - Mayor: Andrea Baldini (Partito Democratico)

Area
  - Total: 312 km^{2} (120 sq mi)
- Elevation: 7 m (23 ft)

Population (30 April 2017)
  - Total: 21,521
  - Density: 69.0/km^{2} (179/sq mi)
- Demonym: Argentani
- Time zone: UTC+1 (CET)
  - Summer (DST): UTC+2 (CEST)
- Postal code: 44010, 44011, 44014, 44016, 44040, 44048
- Dialing code: 0532
- Patron saint: St. Nicholas
- Saint day: December 6
- Website: Official website

Argenta (Argentano: Arzènta) is a town and county in the province of Ferrara, Emilia-Romagna. It is located about 30 kilometres (19 miles) southeast of Ferrara, and midway between Ferrara and Ravenna.

== Geography ==
Argenta is situated in a flat agricultural region near the Valli di Comacchio lagoon wetlands. Much of the latter is today a wildlife sanctuary and Argenta is home to the Marsh Museum which offers many facilities for ornithology.

== History ==
The town was founded by the Romans. In 1295 it was the seat of a convention of the main Ghibelline leaders of Romagna to decide the course of the war against the Papal forces.

In 1923 a Fascist squad murdered a Catholic priest, don Giovanni Minzoni, an anti-fascist and the voice of the poor farmers in Romagna, as well as a friend of several socialist politicians like Natale Galba.

During World War II the area was part of the German Gothic Line. In April 1945, in the Allied advance of Operation Roast, it was the location of the Battle of the Argenta Gap.

== Monumenti e luoghi d'interesse ==
=== Aree naturali ===
- Valley of Campotto
- Valley of Comacchio
- Dock of Porto - Dock of Bando
- Valley of Argenta (Nature Network 2000)

== Società ==
=== Ethnicities and foreign minorities ===
As of December 31, 2023, the foreign population is 2,609, or 12.36% of the population.

== Twin towns ==
Argenta is twinned with:

- Castelnau-le-Lez, France, since 2003
- Plankstadt, Germany, since 2023

== Main sights ==
- Pieve di San Giorgio, a Palaeo-Christian church on the Reno River.
- Museum of the Valleys of Argenta
- Museo della Bonifica ("Museum of Land Reclamation")
- Duomo di San Nicolò
- San Domenico

== Transportation ==
Argenta is located on the SS16 Adriatica state highway, which connects it to Ferrara and Ravenna. It has a rail-station on the Ferrara-Rimini railroad.
