= Duomo di San Nicolò, Argenta =

Italian Catholic cathedral

Coordinates: 44°36′56″N 11°50′14″E

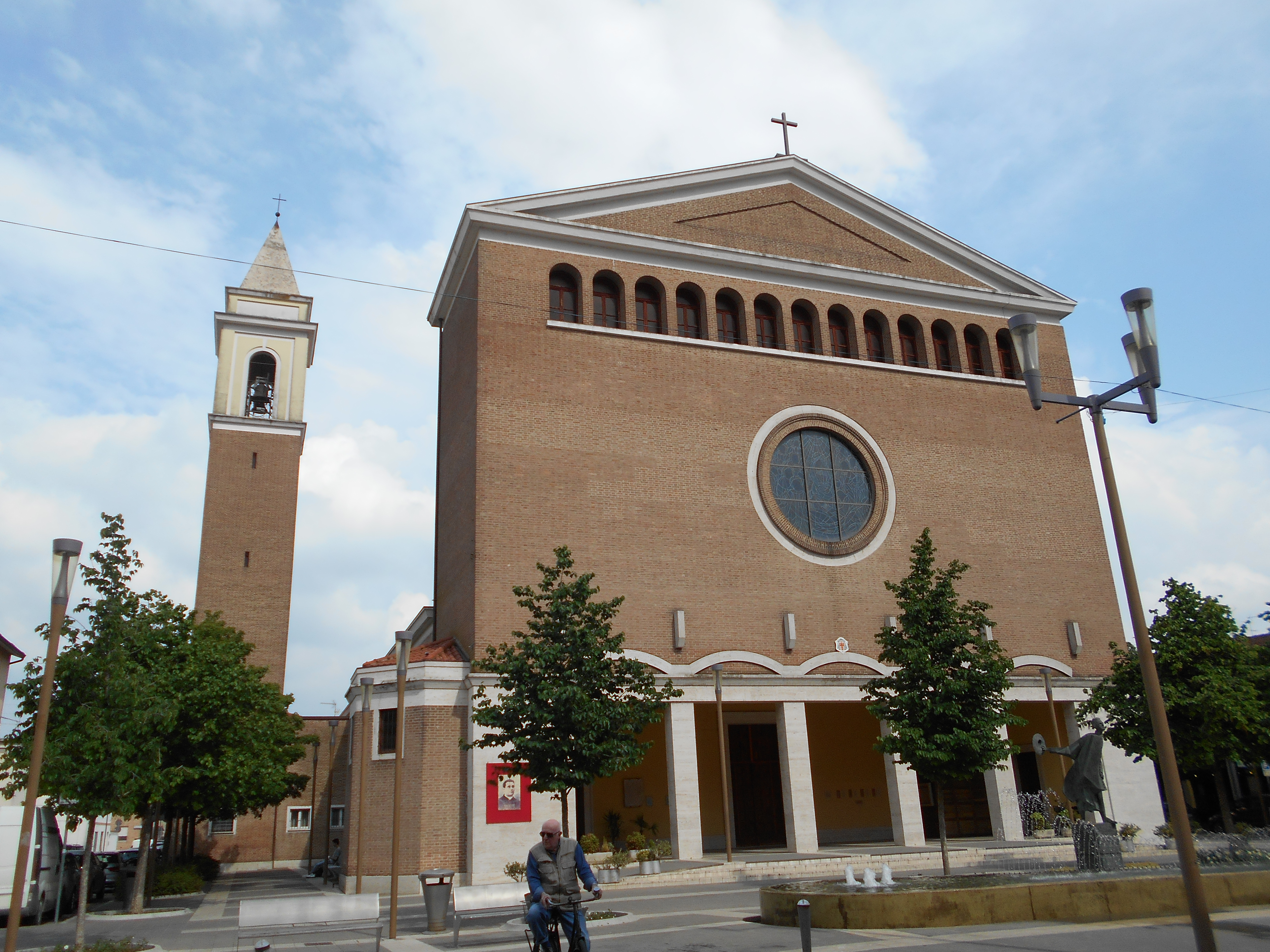

The Duomo di San Nicolò is the Roman Catholic cathedral of Argenta, a municipality in the province of Ferrara, region of Emilia-Romagna, Italy. The former church at the site was destroyed during a bombardment in World War II; a new church was consecrated in 1954.

== History ==
The first documentation of the Collegiate church of San Nicolò, led by an archpriest, is from 1122, suggesting an early Christian foundation. Previously called San Nicolò in Borgo, because it was located in the borgo, a site outside the medieval walls; in addition, it is dedicated to the patron of the town, Nicolas of Bari. The church was enlarged in 1500 and reconsecrated in 1577. The former Renaissance facade had a statue by San Nicolò. It contains the remains of Father Giovanni Manzoni, who was murdered in 1923 by members of the Fascist party.
