= San Domenico, Argenta =

Former Catholic church in Argenta, Italy

Coordinates: 44.61765°N 11.83026°E

San Domenico is a former-Roman Catholic church located on via G.B. Aleotti #39, in Argenta, a municipality in the province of Ferrara, region of Emilia-Romagna, Italy. Once called the church of Santi Giovanni Battista ed Evangelista, it now serves as the local civic museum (Museo Civico).

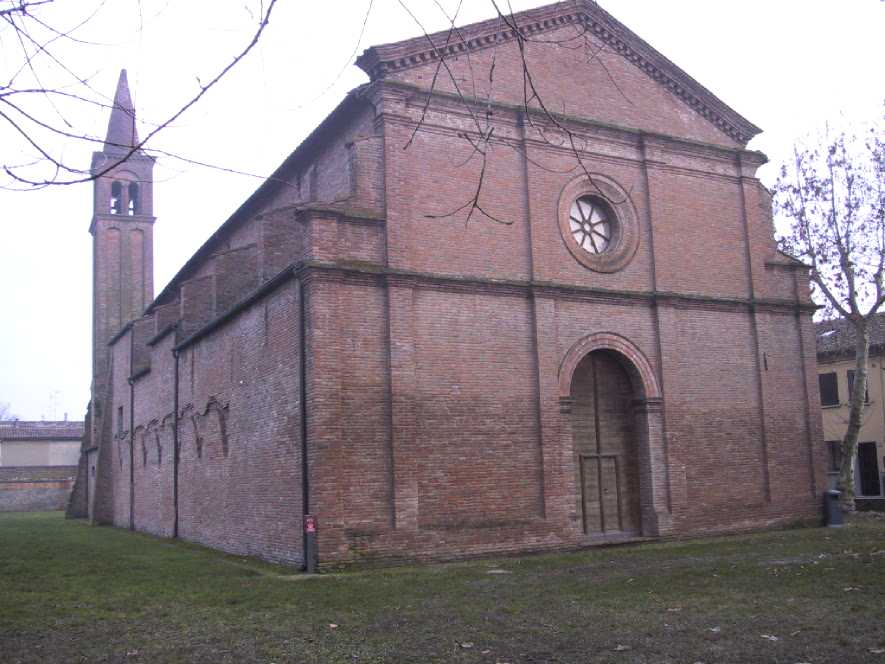
San Domenico

== History ==
In 1495 the flagellant Confraternity dei Battuti Bianchi, ceded to monks of the Dominican Order, that had just moved into the town, their oratory (prayer hall), dedicated previously to both Saints John the Baptist and John the Evangelist.

Construction of the brick church in a late-Gothic and early-Renaissance style began in 1522. The church has a single nave with twelve chapels. In the apse are 16th century frescoes by the school of Benedetto Coda, including a scene of the Decapitation of St John the Baptist and a Baptism of Christ. Also painted around the windows of the apse are the four doctors of the church (from left to right, Gregory, Ambrose, Augustine, and Jerome) and the four Evangelists.

The church had some refurbishment in the second half of the 18th century, and underwent restoration in 1973, when it housed for a time local museum displays. It now displays both local paintings and archeologic findings, including a Madonna and Child between Saints Lazarus and Job by Il Garofalo.
