= Giovanni Minzoni =

Italian anti-fascist Catholic priest

Father Giovanni Minzoni
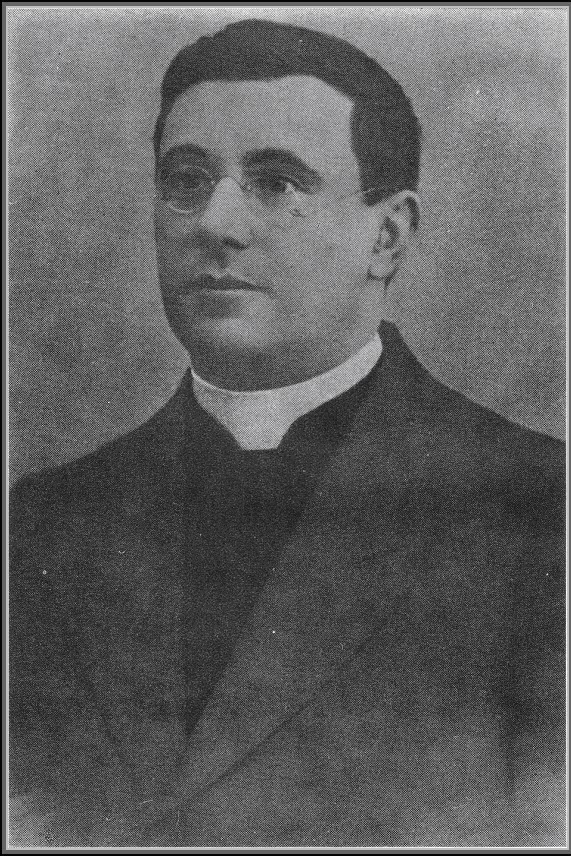
- Portrait photograph of Giovanni Minzoni
- Church: Catholic Church
- Previous post(s): Army Chaplain

Orders
- Ordination: 1909

Personal details
- Born: 1 July 1885; Ravenna
- Died: 23 August 1923 (aged 38); Argenta
- Education: Scuola Sociale, Bergamo

Giovanni Minzoni (1 July 1885 – 23 August 1923) was an Italian anti-fascist Catholic priest who was killed by a fascist squad in 1923.

== Early years ==
Minzoni was born on 1 July 1885 to a middle-class family in Ravenna. He studied in a seminary and in 1909 was ordained priest. The following year he was appointed deputy pastor in the town of Argenta (in Emilia-Romagna), which he left in 1912 to go to study in the Scuola Sociale in Bergamo, where he was awarded his degree.

Called up by the army of the Kingdom of Italy in August 1916, he asked to serve as a military chaplain among the young soldiers at the Italian north-eastern front, and during a very critical moment in the Battle of the Piave River, he showed great courage, for which he was awarded the Silver Medal of Military Valor.

== Antifascism and the scout movement ==
At the end of World War I, Minzoni returned to Argenta, where he joined the Popular Party (Partito Popolare Italiano), the forerunner of the Christian Democrats. Although this was a rather centrist party, he became friends with the socialist labour union leader Natale Gaiba, who was assassinated by the blackshirts in 1923. This and many other episodes turned him against fascism. In addition to his ideas about social rights, he became increasingly convinced of the need for cooperation, thus becoming an open enemy of the fascist regime that strongly favoured corporativism.

Minzoni opposed the introduction of the fascist youth movement, the Opera Nazionale Balilla, in Argenta, because he believed the young people of the town should instead be educated in the values of Catholicism. After meeting Father Emilio Faggioli, who founded the scout group Bologna I in April 1917, and who became regional assistant for the Catholic Scouts in Emilia-Romagna, Minzoni became convinced of the virtues and good values taught by the Scout Movement. He therefore decided to found a scout group in his own parish.

In July 1923, Minzoni invited Faggioli to speak about the aims of the Scout Movement in the parish hall in Argenta. Local fascists vocally objected to the formation of a youth group not under the control of Mussolini and vowed that no scouts would enter the main square, to which Faggioli replied that the scouts would enter the main square as long as Minzoni was there. More than seventy scouts were subsequently enrolled.

== Death ==
Increasingly in conflict with the local Mussolinian establishment, Minzoni was killed around 10:30 pm on 23 August 1923, by two fascist "squadristi", Giorgio Molinari and Vittore Casoni, who smashed his skull with a club; they were reportedly following orders of the local Console di Milizia Italo Balbo, who was so shaken by the scandal that he had to resign from his post temporarily. All the accused were later acquitted at trial in 1925.

Just before his death, Minzoni wrote in his diary:

With an open heart, with a prayer for my persecutors that will never disappear from my lips, I await the tempest, the persecution, maybe even death, for the cause of Christ to triumph.

His death turned his prayer into reality, fulfilling a promise he made before departing for WWI:

I pray God to let me die, doing my duty as a Priest and an Italian until my last moment, and happy to end my brief life in the supreme sacrifice.

== Aftermath ==
The Italian newspapers Il Popolo and La Voce Repubblicana, still operating with a degree of freedom, covered the murder extensively, naming those directly responsible and their instigator, Italo Balbo. They were absolved at trial due to interference and pressure from the fascist squads and media.

A new trial was held after the end of World War II, when the fascists were no longer able to threaten and cover up the truth. The verdict absolved Balbo and condemned Giorgio Molinari and Vittore Casoni for second-degree murder.

After the war, Minzoni became a symbol of the Italian Catholic Resistance, and many books were written about his martyrdom. As of 2016, his death was still being commemorated by such groups as Azione Cattolica and the Christian Associations of Italian Workers. Pope John Paul II wrote to the bishop of Ravenna on the 60th anniversary of Minzoni's death:

Don Minzoni died as a "victim of choice" at the hands of blind and brutal violence, but the essence of his sacrifice goes further than simple opposition to a repressive regime, and puts him at the level required by the Catholic Faith. His spiritual attractiveness, exerted upon the people of those small towns, over the labourers and especially over the young, was the factor which triggered the aggression (against him). They especially wanted to hack at the roots of his teaching work, which aimed at raising young people to prepare them for both a Christian life and a commitment to changing and improving society. For these reasons, the Catholic Scouts have a debt towards him.

== Bibliography ==
=== In Italian ===
- Lorenzo Bedeschi, Diario di Don Minzoni, (1965).
- Nicola Palumbi, Don Giovanni Minzoni. Educatore e martire, Milan 2003.
- Alberto Comuzzi; card. Ersilio Tonini (preface) (1985). Don Minzoni : il Matteotti cattolico. Testimoni nel tempo (in Italian). Padova: Edizioni Messaggero. p. 134. ISBN 9788870265712. OCLC 18452162.

== See also ==
- Censorship in Italy
