= The Doge's Palace Seen from San Giorgio Maggiore (Claude Monet) =

Painting by Claude Monet

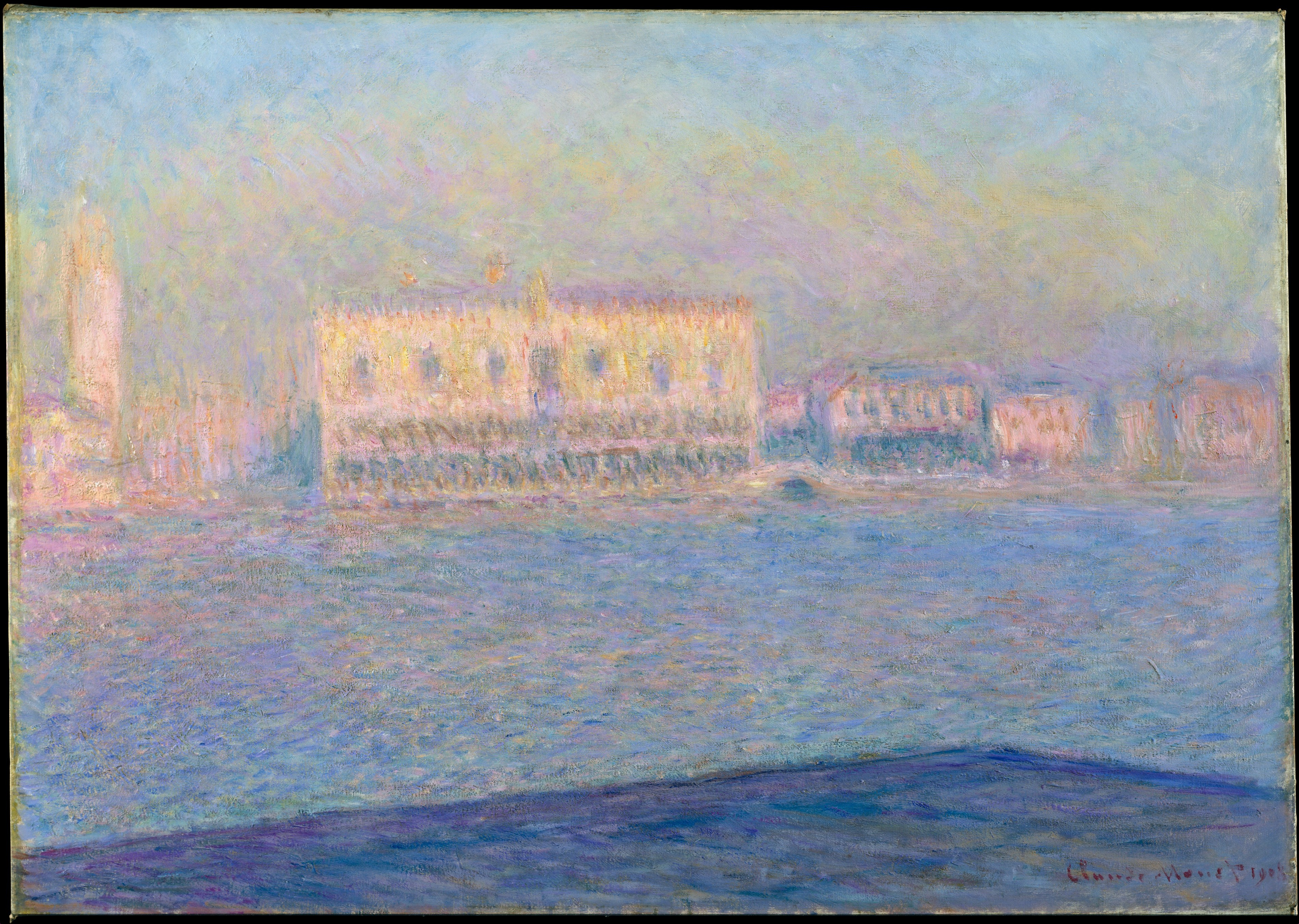
- Artist: Claude Monet
- Year: 1908
- Medium: oil paint, canvas
- Dimensions: 65.4 cm (25.7 in) × 92.7 cm (36.5 in)
- Location: Metropolitan Museum of Art
- Accession: 59.188.1

The Doge's Palace Seen from San Giorgio Maggiore (in French: Le Palais Ducal vu de Saint-Georges Majeur) is a 1908 painting by Claude Monet that resides in the collection of the Metropolitan Museum of Art. The painting, catalogued W1755 in the Wildenstein catalogue raisonné, is one of a series of six versions of this scene painted by Monet in 1908. Other versions are held by the Kunsthaus Zürich and the Solomon R. Guggenheim Museum.

== Early history and creation ==
Monet created this work during his visit to Venice in late 1908. He returned to his home in France with many paintings incomplete, and he took a few years to prepare 29 works for exhibition. In 1912 he held a successful show Claude Monet Venise at the gallery Bernheim-Jeune in Paris.

Six versions (W1751 to W1756) were created to capture the varied lighting throughout the day. Monet often made multiple copies of the same work of art, a process known as series painting. His series paintings originated in his early career when he and other impressionists became interested in en plein air and were inspired by the effects of changing light.

The Doge's Palace was done later in his career after he had already established his artistic style, however this work is considered less successful because of the scant time he spent in Venice and because he had to finish the series by memory later in Paris.

== Description and interpretation ==
The Doge's Palace is composed of oil on canvas and its dimensions are 25 3/4 x 36 1/2 inches.

This work depicts the Doge's Palace, an iconic landmark of Venice and the historic seat of government of the Republic of Venice, along with buildings of the Riva degli Schiavoni waterfront. The scene is viewed from the island of San Giorgio Maggiore across the Bacino di San Marco canal. Monet chose a viewpoint on the edge of the piazza in front of Palladio's famous abbey church (Abbazia di San Giorgio Maggiore).

== Later history and influence ==
Although Monet spent little time in Venice, works that he started in Venice, such as The Doge's Palace, are some of his most highly regarded. These paintings capture his signature style and influence from the effervescent Venetian sunset. After this painting was exhibited in Paris in 1912 it went on to travel the world, and has found its permanent home at the Metropolitan Museum of Art in New York, N.Y.

== Similar paintings by Monet ==
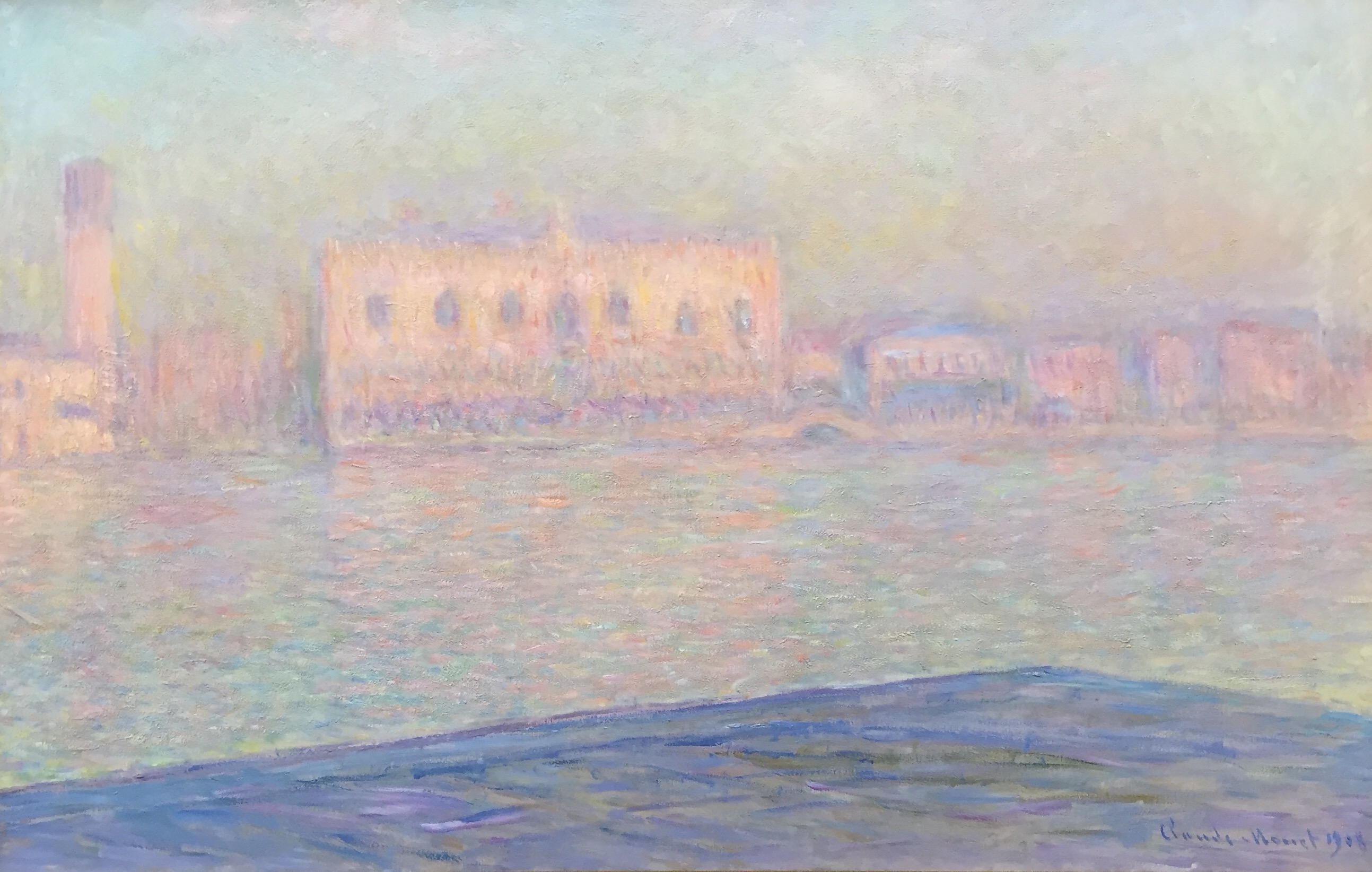
Le Palais Ducal vu de Saint-Georges Majeur, Kunsthaus Zürich (W1751)

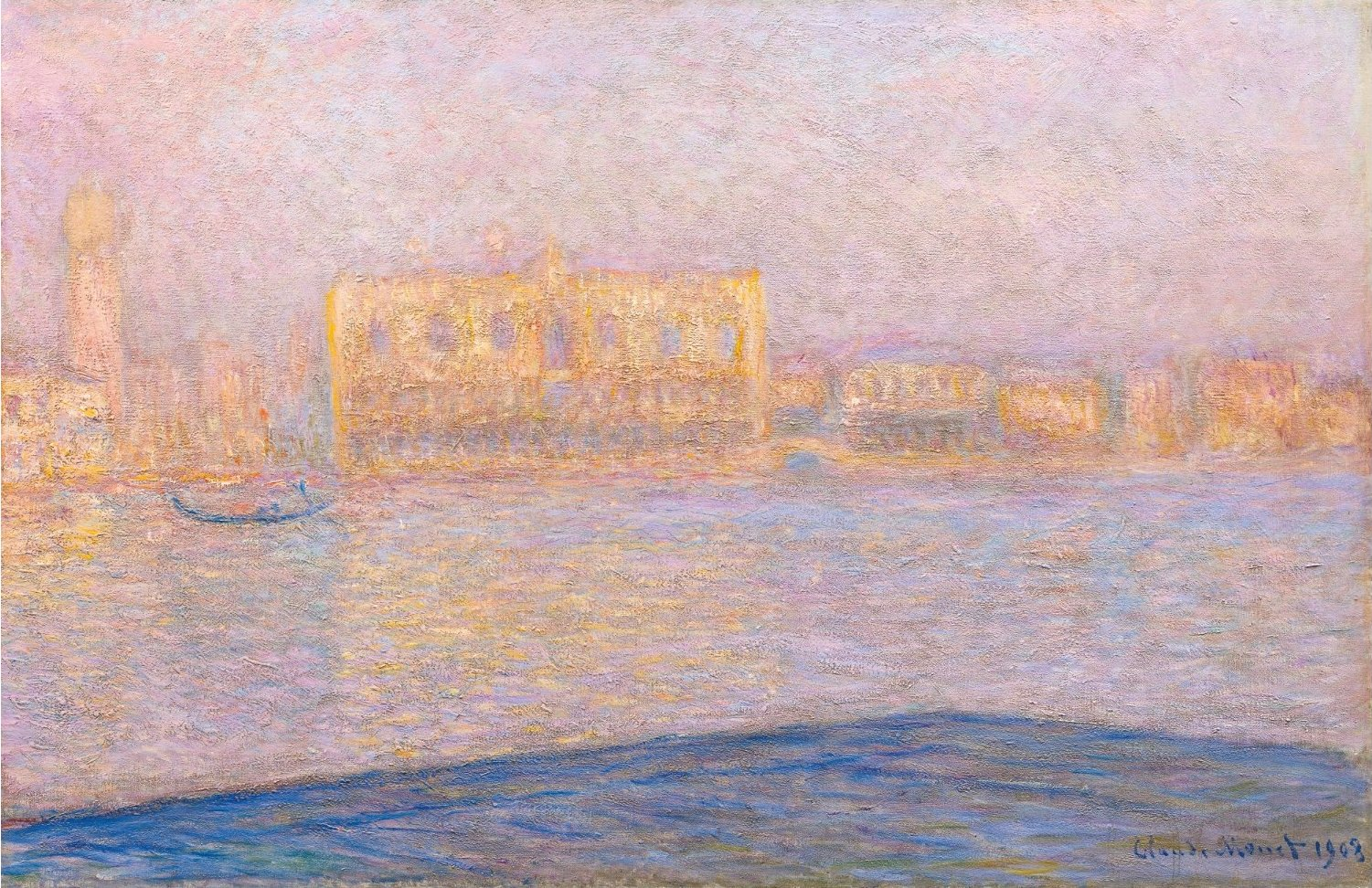
Le Palais Ducal vu de Saint-Georges Majeur, Sotheby's, 2016 (W1752)

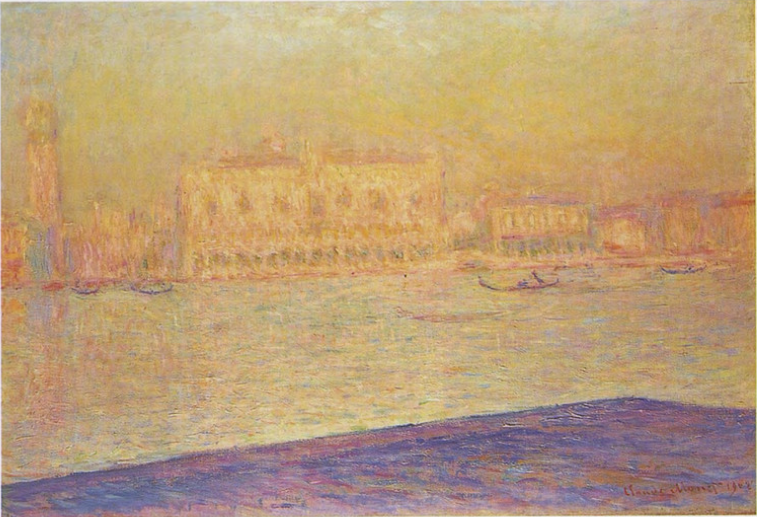
Le Palais ducal vu de Saint-Georges Majeur, private collection (W1753)

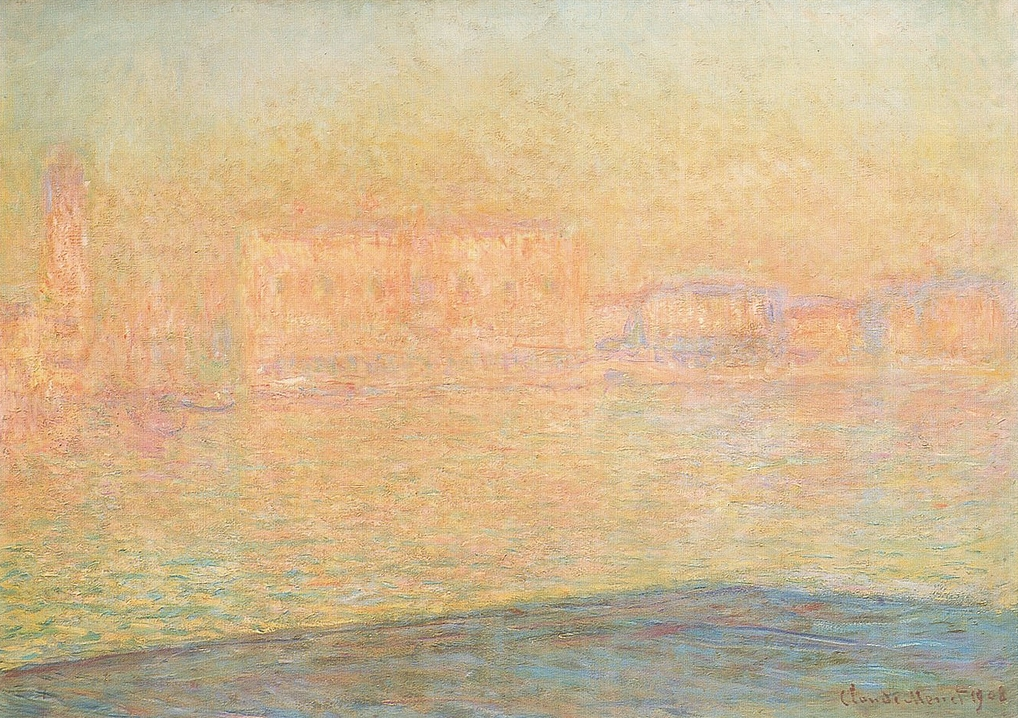
Le Palais ducal vu de Saint-Georges Majeur, private collection, Christie's, 1992 (W1754)

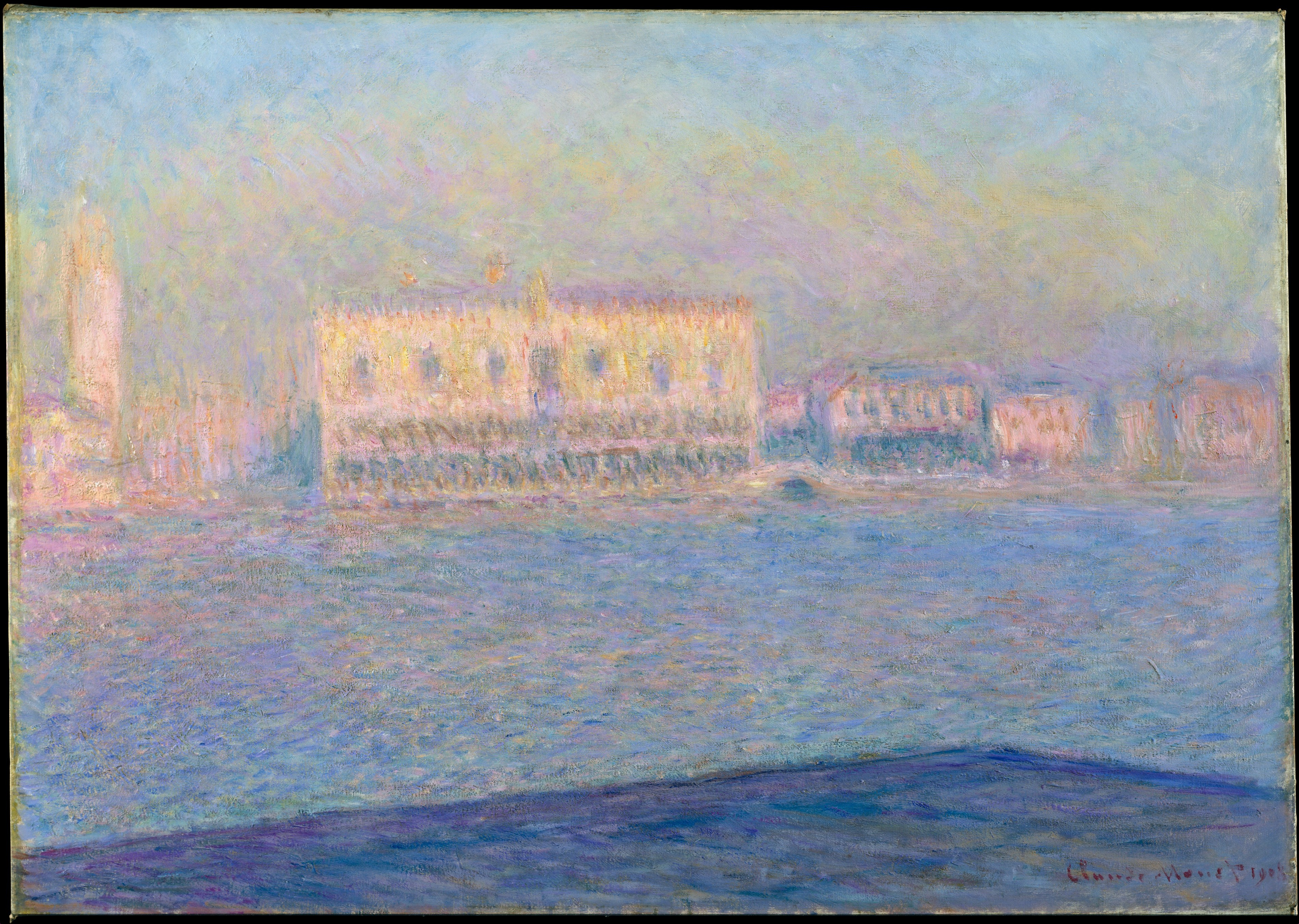
The Doge's Palace Seen from San Giorgio Maggiore, Metropolitan Museum of Art (W1755)

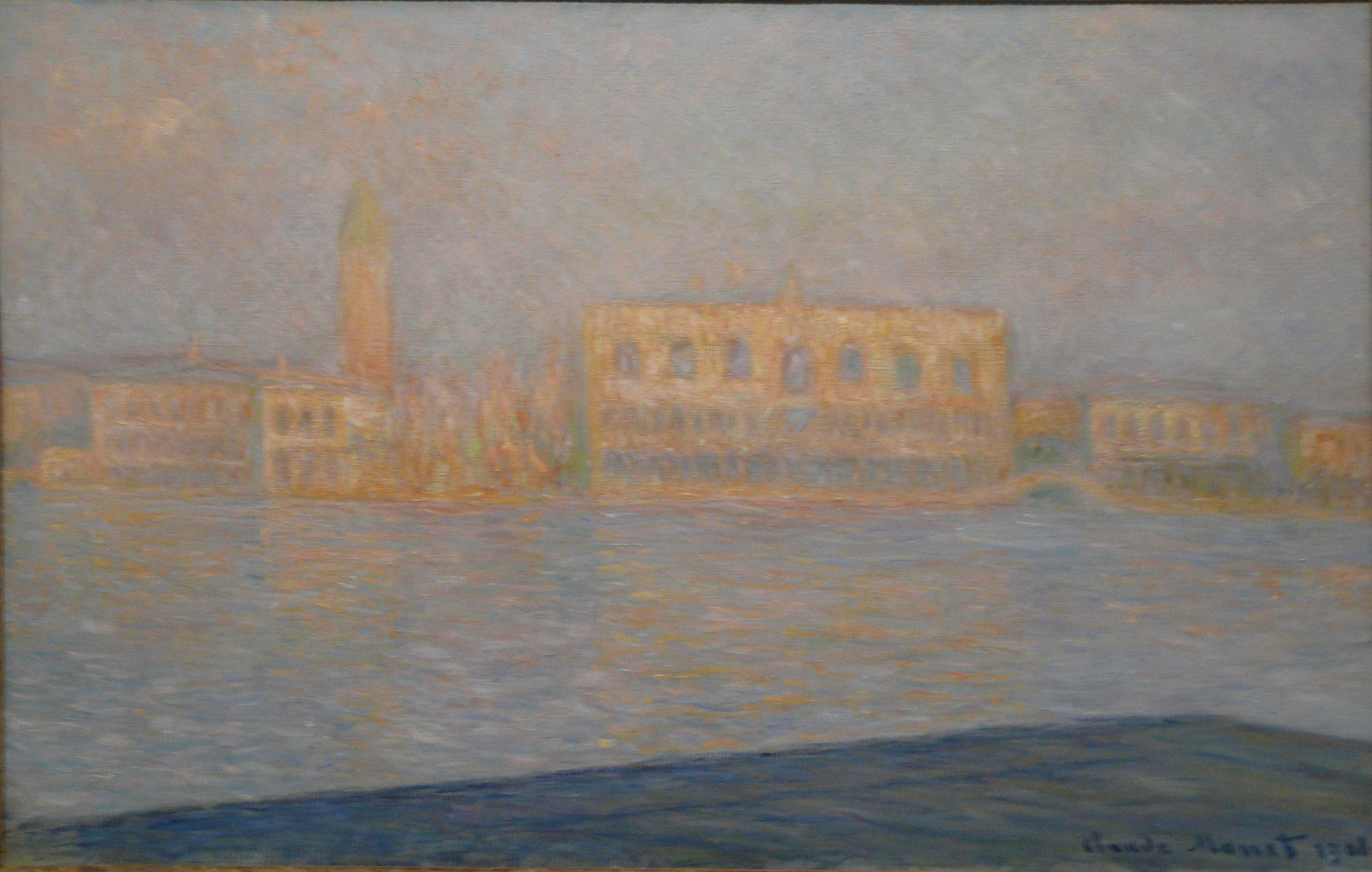
Le Palais ducal vu de Saint-Georges Majeur, Solomon R. Guggenheim Museum (W1756)

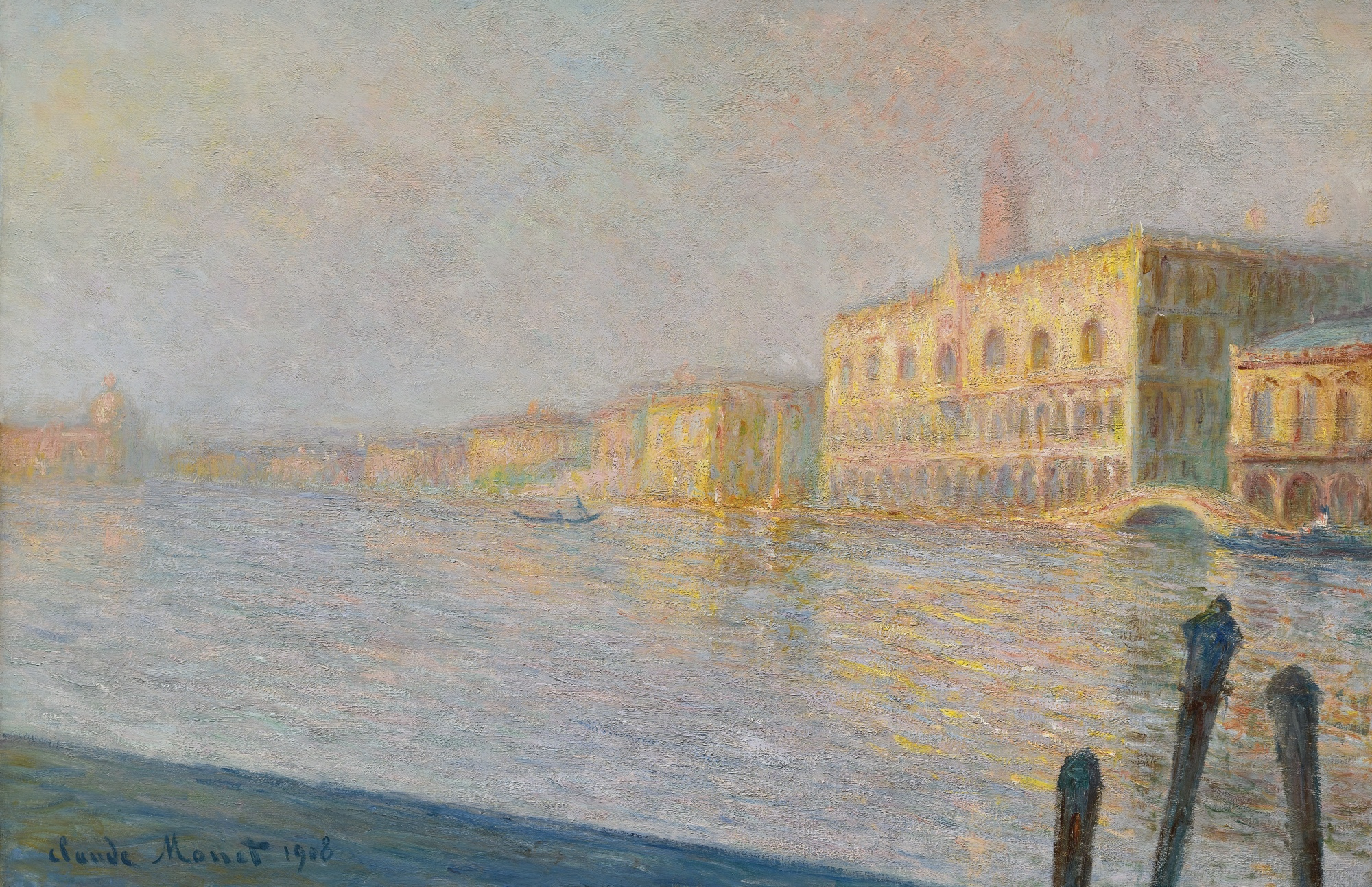
Le Palais Ducal, Hasso Plattner collection, Museum Barberini (W1770)

== See also ==
- List of paintings by Claude Monet
- History of the Doge's Palace in Venice
