= San Giorgio Maggiore at Dusk =

Painting by Claude Monet

- Saint-Georges Majeur au Crépuscule (French), San Giorgio Maggiore al crepuscolo (Italian)
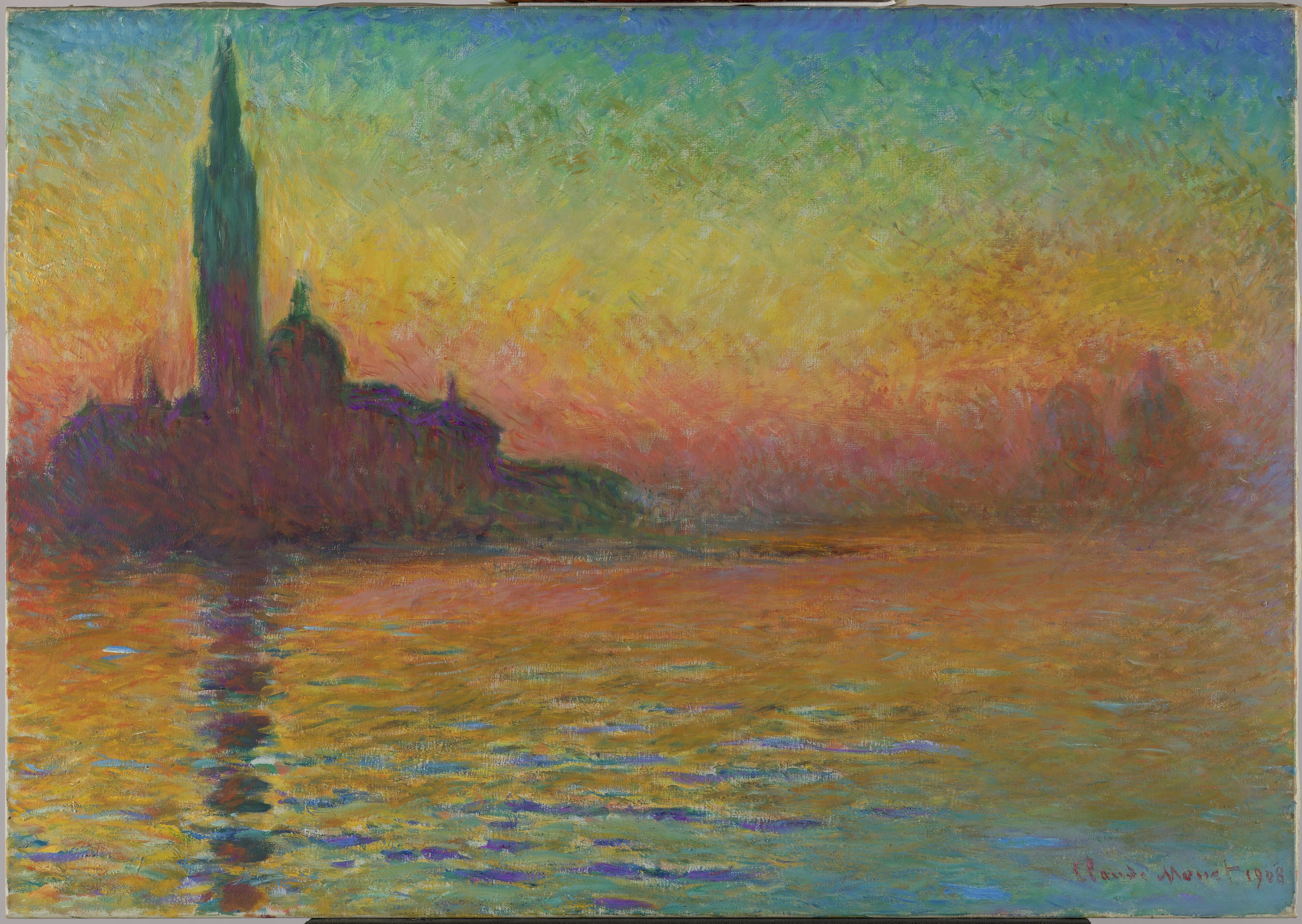
- Artist: Claude Monet
- Year: 1908–1912
- Catalogue: W1768
- Medium: Oil on canvas
- Dimensions: 65.2 cm × 92.4 cm (25.7 in × 36.4 in)
- Location: National Museum Cardiff

Saint-Georges majeur au crépuscule (English: Dusk in Venice, San Giorgio Maggiore by Twilight or Sunset in Venice) is an Impressionist painting by Claude Monet, which exists in more than one version. It forms part of a series of views of the monastery-island of San Giorgio Maggiore. This series is in turn part of a larger series of views of Venice which Monet began in 1908 during his only visit there.

== Versions in Cardiff and Tokyo ==
One version of San Giorgio Maggiore at Dusk was acquired in Paris by the Welsh art collector Gwendoline Davies. She bequeathed it to the National Museum of Wales (now National Museum Cardiff) in Cardiff. The painting is normally on display there.

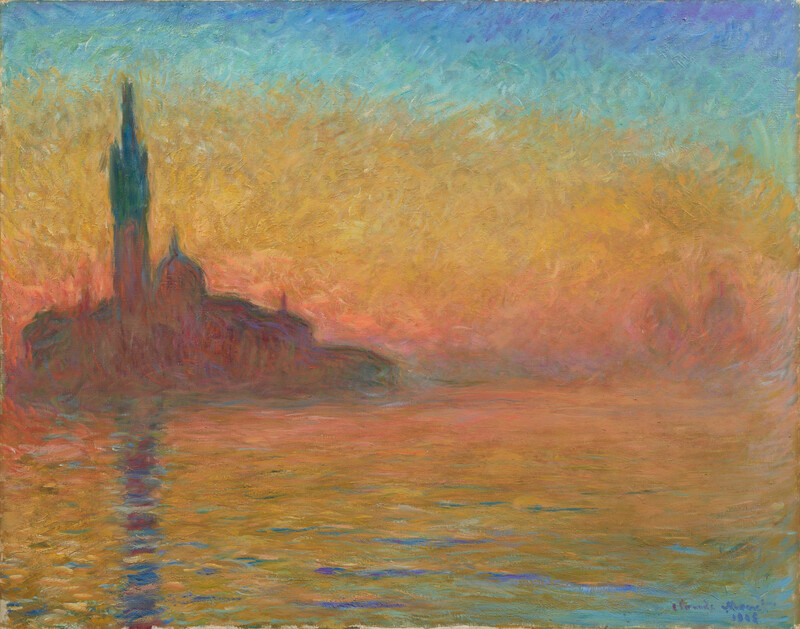
Version in the Artizon Museum, Tokyo

The other version (W1769) is in the Artizon Museum (formerly the Bridgestone Museum of Art) in Tokyo.

== Description of the painting ==
San Giorgio Maggiore al Crepuscolo is approximately two-by-three feet and painted in oil on canvas. It depicts mysterious buildings that seem to magically appear from the surrounding landscape; they almost seem to float in the background. The forms are gently inserted, though not enough to disguise their identity. The painting focuses on the Church of San Giorgio Maggiore with its bell tower rising to the top of the painting. To the right are the faintly visible domes of Santa Maria della Salute and the mouth of the Grand Canal.

== Monet and San Giorgio Maggiore ==
Monet painted the church of San Giorgio Maggiore in six lighting conditions. With this varied approach, the paintings focused on the "nature of experience". He was particularly impressed by the Venetian sunsets, "these splendid sunsets which are unique in the world". He had previously been inspired by other sunsets, such as those of Normandy (in Rouen Cathedral and Haystacks, his series of the 1890s) and London (in the Houses of Parliament series).

=== Viewpoints ===
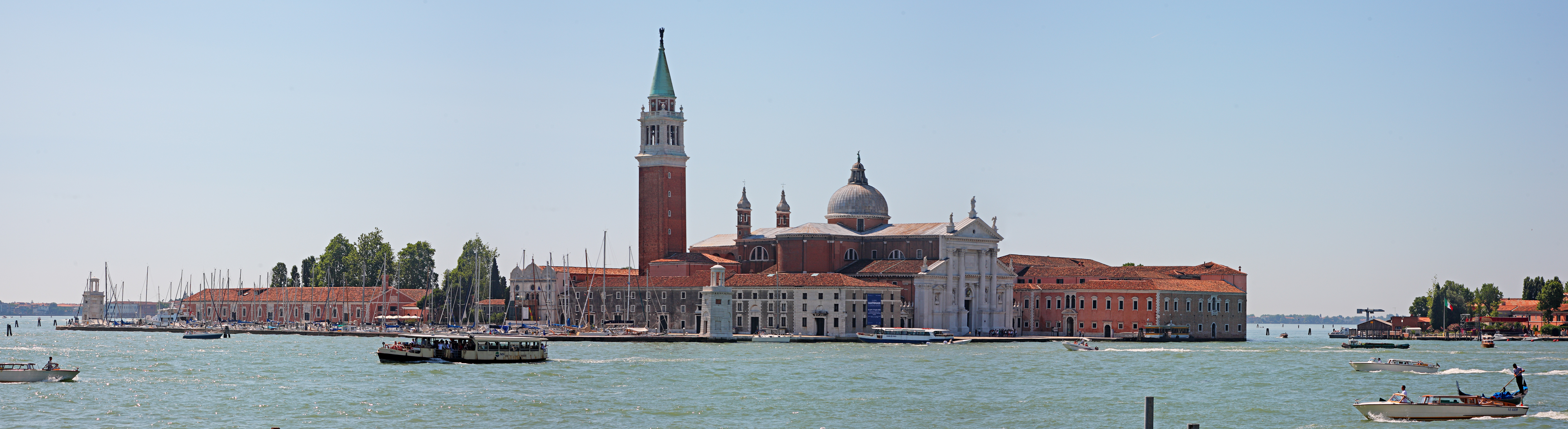
This photo separates the campanile and dome of San Giorgio Maggiore, as it is taken from a position nearer the Grand Canal than the dusk paintings.

Monet and his wife Alice stayed at the Palazzo Barbaro for a couple of weeks, and then moved to the Hotel Britannia, where they stayed until December. According to Mme. Monet, the Britannia had a view, "if such a thing were possible, even more beautiful than that of Palazzo Barbaro..." Monet painted looking out from this hotel, but not, it seems, in the case of this particular painting. Although the view from the hotel included the church of San Giorgio Maggiore, the painting at dusk appears to have been viewed from the waterfront known as the Riva degli Schiavoni, where the island forms a focal point of the view. Monet was reportedly reluctant to paint from the waterfront. He disliked crowds of tourists and he was also worried about conforming to other artists who were drawn to Venice, such as Renoir or Manet. San Giorgio Maggiore was a favourite subject for painters, including the proto-Impressionist Turner.

== Completion of the paintings in France ==
Monet felt that Venice was a city "too beautiful to be painted", which may be why he returned with many paintings unfinished to Giverny, his home in France. However, he had already retreated from his earlier practice of painting from life, in front of the subject. He worked on the Venetian scenes at home and the death of his wife Alice in 1911 seems to have been a factor in their completion.

== Dispersal ==
In 1912 the Venice paintings were mainly dispersed as a result of a successful exhibition of twenty-nine canvases. This exhibition, entitled Claude Monet Venise, was held at the gallery Bernheim-Jeune in Paris. The same gallery had hosted exhibitions of the Rouen and London series.

== In popular culture ==
The painting became familiar in 1999 after its appearance in John McTiernan’s heist film The Thomas Crown Affair. In the film the picture is stolen from the Metropolitan Museum of Art. In actuality, the Metropolitan does not own the painting, although it has another of Monet's Venetian scenes The Doge's Palace Seen from San Giorgio Maggiore.

A detail of the painting appeared on the cover of the pianist Marc-André Hamelin's album, Gabriel Fauré: Nocturnes & Barcarolles.

== See also ==
- List of paintings by Claude Monet
- Other paintings from Monet's San Giorgio Maggiore series are on permanent exhibition at National Museum Cardiff and the Indianapolis Museum of Art
