= Pieve di San Giorgio =

Church in Argenta (FE)

Coordinates: 44.6119°N 11.8202°E

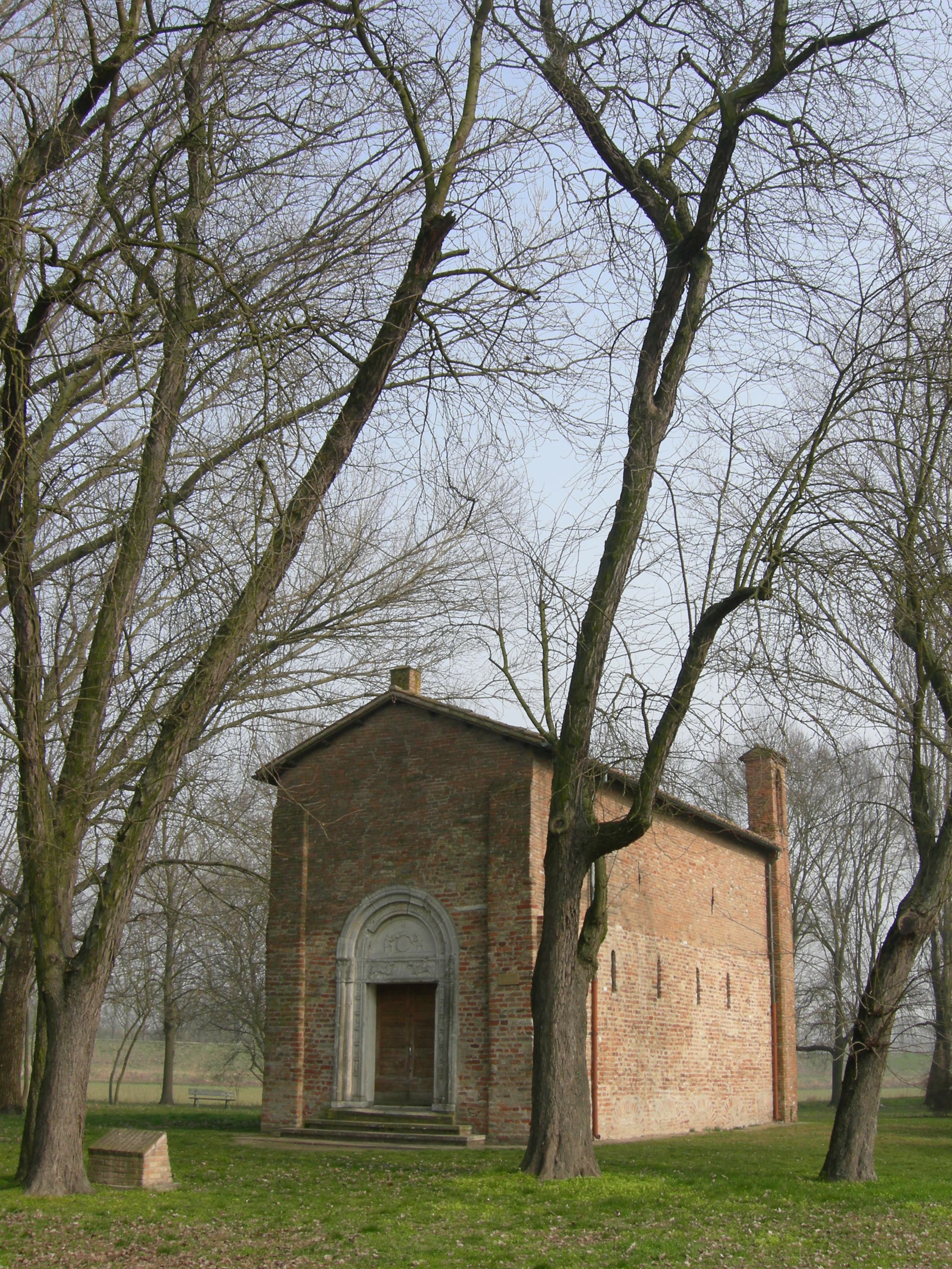
The Pieve di San Giorgio.

The Pieve di San Giorgio is a church in the comune of Argenta, northern Italy. It is the most ancient church in the province of Ferrara and one of the most ancient ones in Emilia-Romagna region.

Located on the right bank of the Reno River, it was founded in 569 by the archbishop of Ravenna.

== Description ==
It had originally a nave and two aisles, with a pentagonal apse; today it has only the nave. Much of the original church is now 2 metres under the ground level.

The interior houses a Byzantine altar and traces of 12th century paintings. Also notable is the portal with its lunette depicting the Martyrdom of St. George whose naked body blessed by the hand of God is held by two clothed men against a spiked wheel. The lintel below contains confronted griffins. The date of the sculpture 1122 and the name of the artist Iohannes de Mutiglianus are both recorded on the borders of the lintel. The Pieve once had a baptismal font.
