= San Giorgio Maggiore (Monet series) =

1908 series of paintings by Claude Monet

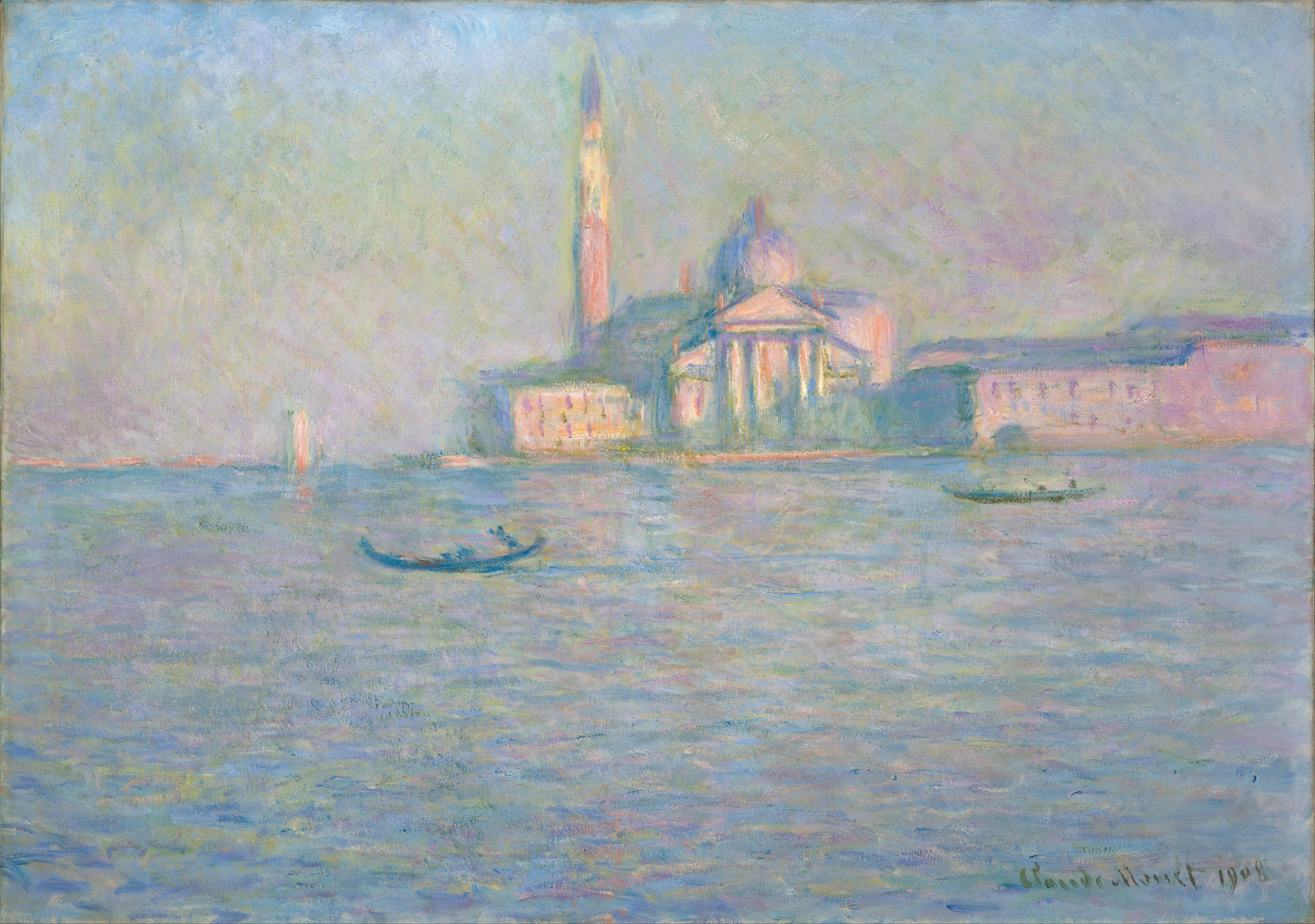
San Giorgio Maggiore in the collection of Indianapolis Museum of Art, The Lockton Collection, 70.76, discovernewfields.org

Claude Monet painted a series of paintings of the island-monastery of San Giorgio Maggiore in Venice. They were begun in 1908 during the artist's only visit to the city. One of the best known is San Giorgio Maggiore at Dusk, which exists in two versions.

Monet completed his paintings of Venice at home in France and in 1912 showed them in Paris. Buyers included the Welsh collector Gwendoline Davies, who bought three paintings.

A painting by Monet, described as being of San Giorgio Maggiore, was seized in July 2016 by Swiss officials on behalf of U.S. authorities. The owner, Jho Low, embezzled funds from 1Malaysia Development BHD., a government investment fund. He had purchased the painting for $35 million.

== List of the paintings ==
- All works listed are described as Painting - oil on canvas.
- The Catalog Nos are as defined by Daniel Wildenstein in the Monet: Catalogue Raisonné.

Painting	Year	Catalog No	Museum	Picture
San Giorgio Maggiore	1908	(W.1746)		
San Giorgio Maggiore	1908	(W.1747)	Amgueddfa Cymru – Museum Wales	
San Giorgio Maggiore	1908	(W.1748)		
San Giorgio Maggiore	1908	(W.1749)	Indianapolis Museum of Art	
San Giorgio Maggiore by twilight	1908	(W.1750)		

== Public display ==
In 2018, the National Gallery in London exhibited nine of the Venice paintings, including three paintings of the series, together in a single room, for the duration of a temporary exhibition titled Monet & Architecture, devoted to Claude Monet's use of architecture as a means to structure and enliven his art. This was a rare occurrence because no museum owns or exhibits more than two in a permanent collection.

The three paintings exhibited were the examples from the following collections:

- Undisclosed private collection
- Indianapolis Museum of Art
- National Museum Cardiff

== See also ==
- List of paintings by Claude Monet
- Monet also used San Giorgio Maggiore as a view-point for The Doge's Palace Seen from San Giorgio Maggiore.
