= San Giorgio Maggiore (church), Venice =

Church of San Giorgio Maggiore
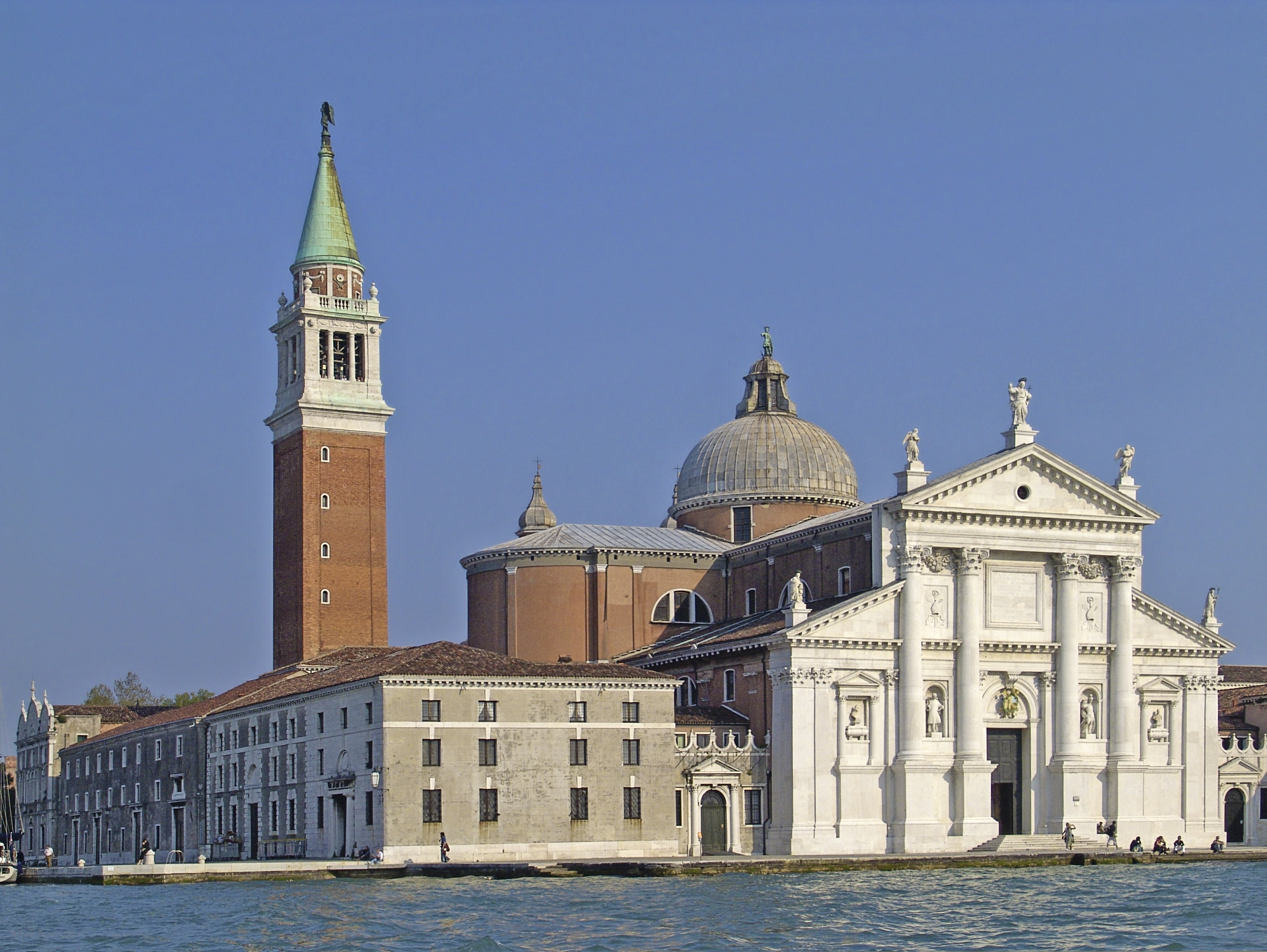
- San Giorgio Maggiore opposite Riva degli Schiavoni
- Click the map for an interactive, fullscreen view
- 45.4293°N 12.3433°E
- Location: Venice
- Country: Italy
- Denomination: Catholic
- Religious order: Order of St Benedict

Architecture
- Architect: Andrea Palladio
- Architectural type: Church
- Groundbreaking: 1566
- Completed: 1610

Administration
- District: Patriarchate of Venice

San Giorgio Maggiore (San Zorzi Mazor in Venetian) is a 16th-century Benedictine church on the island of the same name in Venice, northern Italy, designed by Andrea Palladio, and built between 1566 and 1610. The church is a basilica in the classical Renaissance style and its brilliant white marble gleams above the blue water of the lagoon opposite the Piazzetta di San Marco and forms the focal point of the view from every part of the Riva degli Schiavoni.

== History ==
The first church on the island was built about 790, and in 982 the island was given to the Benedictine order by the Doge Tribuno Memmo. The Benedictines founded a monastery there, but in 1223 all the buildings on the island were destroyed by an earthquake.

The church and monastery were rebuilt after the earthquake. The church, which had a nave with side chapels, was not in the same position as the present church, but farther back at the side of a small campo or square. There were cloisters in front of it, which were demolished in 1516. The monks were considering the rebuilding of the church from 1521.

Palladio arrived in Venice in 1560, when the refectory of the monastery was being rebuilt. He made great improvements to this and in 1565, was asked to prepare a model for a new church.

The model was completed and approved in 1566 and the foundation stone was laid in the presence of the Pope in the same year. The work was not finished before the death of Palladio in 1580, but the body of the church was complete by 1575 except for the choir behind the altar and the facade. The decoration of the interior was completed subsequently.

The choir appears to have been designed in essentials by Palladio before his death and was built between 1580 and 1589.

The façade, initially under the superintendence of Simone Sorella, was not commenced until 1599. The stonemason's contract provided that it was to follow Palladio's model and there were only minor changes. It was completed in 1610.

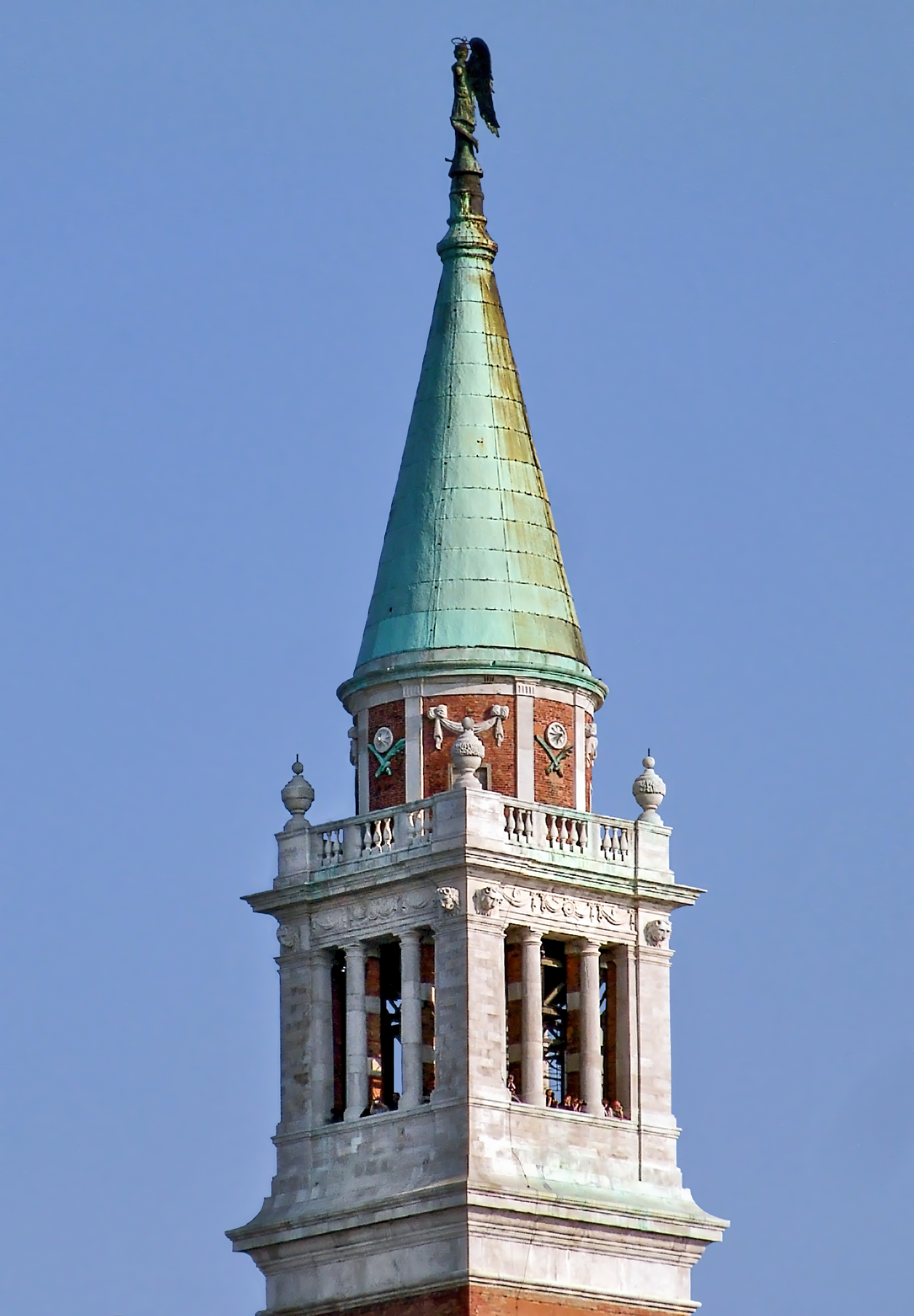
Campanile - Upper part

The campanile (bell tower), first built in 1467, fell in 1774; it was rebuilt in neo-classic style by 1791. It was ascended by easy ramps and there is now also a lift. There is a fine view across Venice from the top.

== Exterior ==
The façade is brilliantly white and represents Palladio's solution to the difficulty of adapting a classical temple facade to the form of the Christian church, with its high nave and low side aisles, which had always been a problem. Palladio's solution superimposed two facades, one with a wide pediment and architrave, extending over the nave and both the aisles, apparently supported by a single order of pilasters, and the other with a narrower pediment (the width of the nave) superimposed on top of it with a giant order of engaged columns on high pedestals. This solution is similar to Palladio's slightly earlier facade for San Francesco della Vigna, where the other parts of the church had been designed by Sansovino. On either side of the central portal are statues of Saint George and of Saint Stephen, to whom the church is also dedicated.

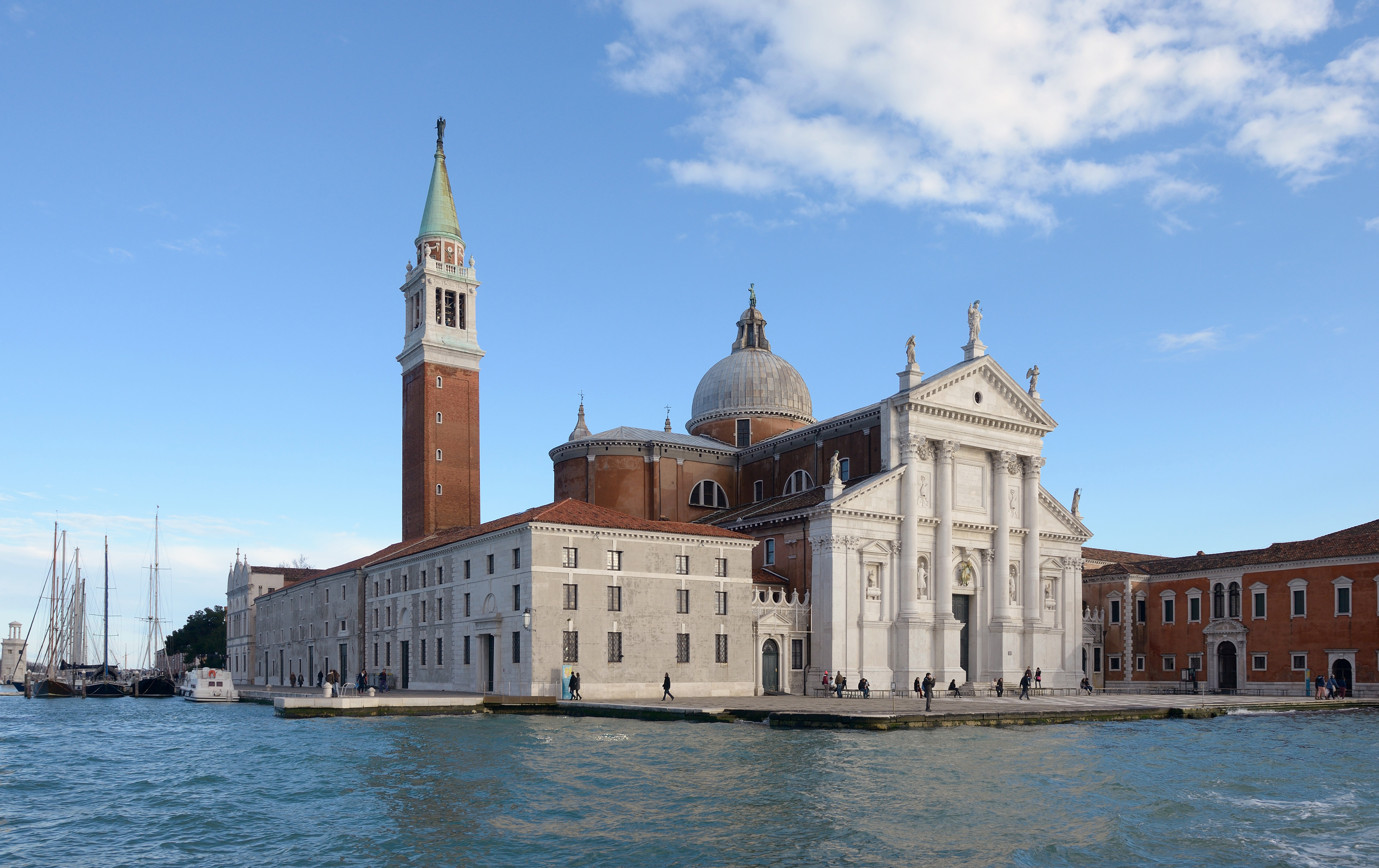
San Giorgio Maggiore seen across the water

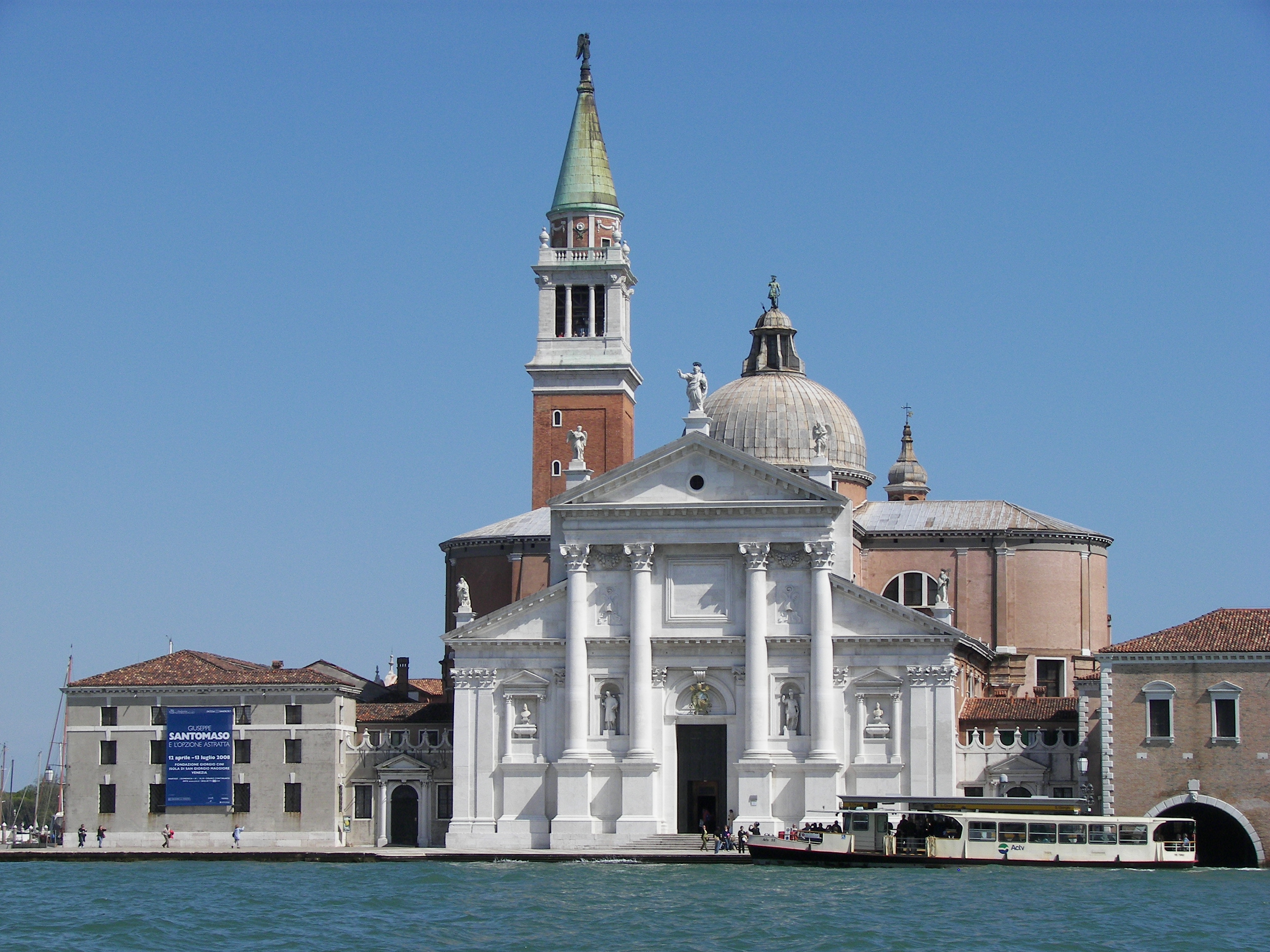
The facade

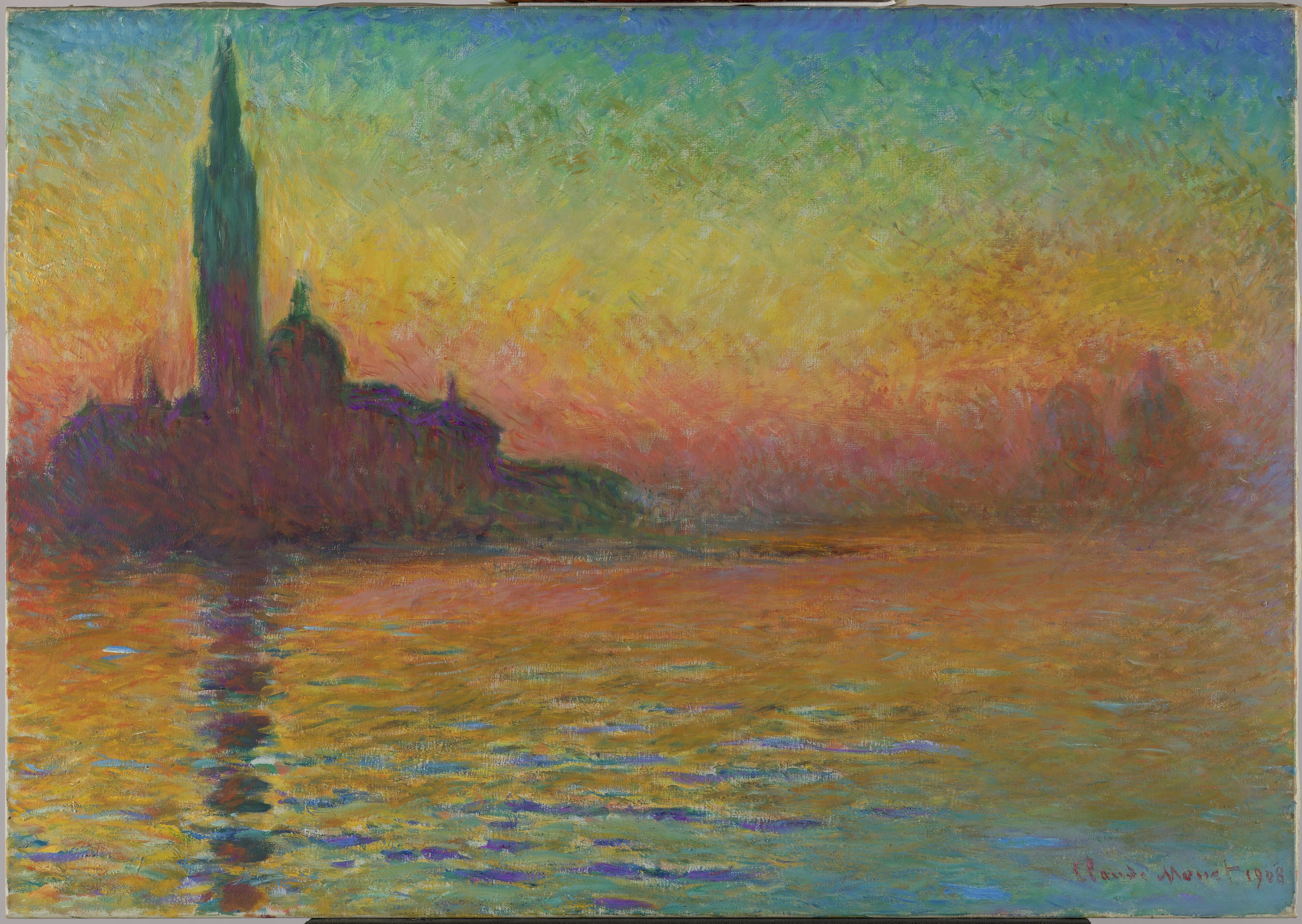
San Giorgio Maggiore at Dusk, Claude Monet, 1908–1912

== Interior ==
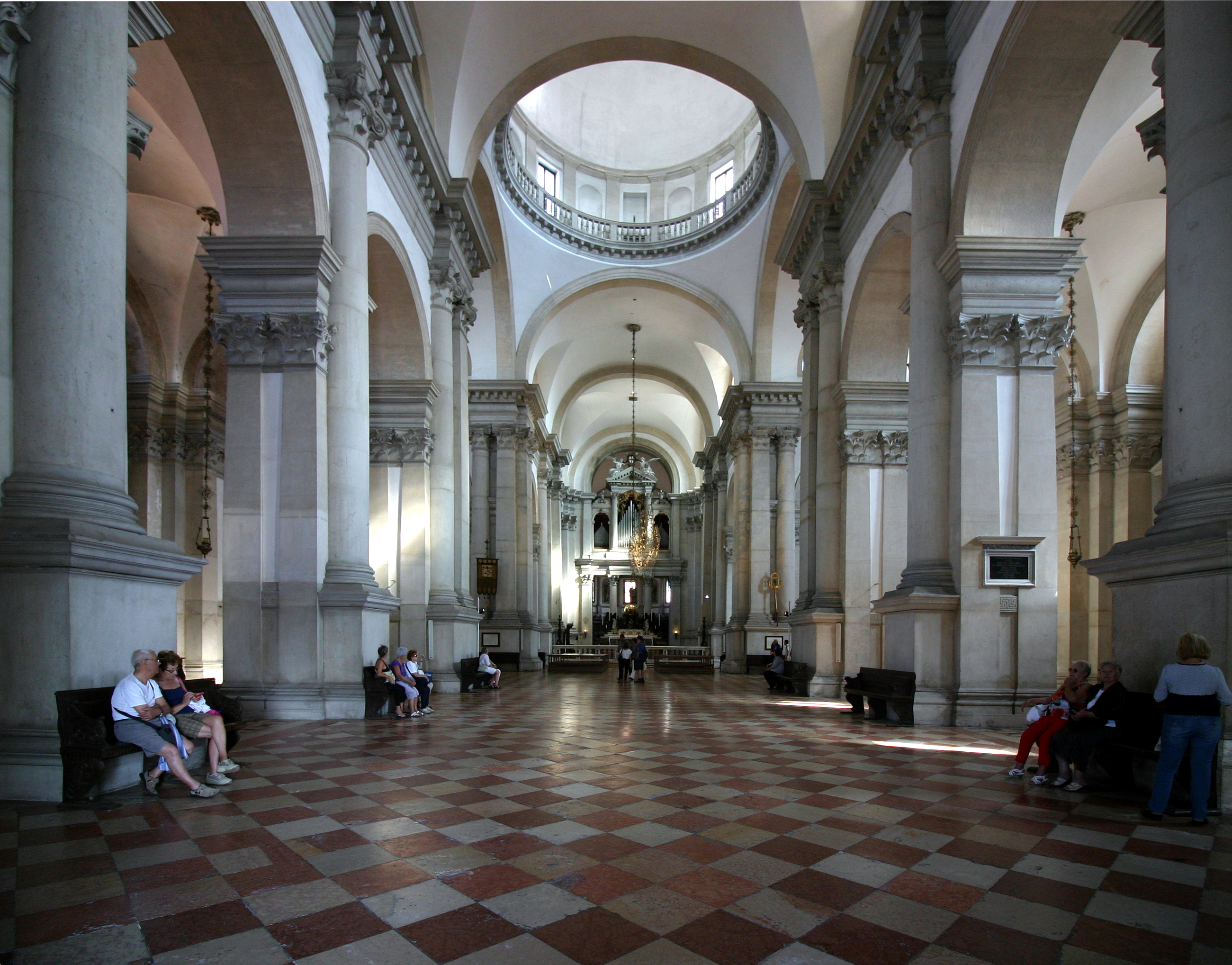
Interior: The nave, looking east towards the high altar

The interior of the church is very bright, with massive engaged columns and pilasters on undecorated, white-surfaced walls. The interior combines a long basilican nave with a cruciform plan with transepts.

Two very large paintings by Tintoretto relate to the institution of the Eucharist and are placed on either side of the presbytery, where they can be seen from the altar rail. These are The Last Supper and The Jews in the desert (which shows them collecting and eating the manna, a gift of God to the Israelites in the desert after they escaped Egypt, and it foretells the gift of the Eucharist).

In the Cappella dei Morti (Chapel of the dead) is a painting of the Entombment of Christ, also by Jacopo Tintoretto.

The Benedictine monks kept control of chapels in the church and did not sell them to families to decorate and embellish as they pleased, as was done in many Venetian churches. They had income from property and were in a stronger position. Some altars were given over to distinguished families but the decoration was controlled by the monks. The chapel to the right of the high altar belonged to the Bollani family (Domenico Bollani had been ambassador to Edward VI in England in 1547 and later a Bishop). Work on this chapel was delayed after the death of Domenico Bollani and it was still unfinished in 1619, with a poor painting as the altarpiece. Another painting was substituted in 1693, but it was not until 1708 that it acquired the important work now seen there, which is the Virgin and Child with Saints by Sebastiano Ricci.

The altar to the left of the sanctuary was the responsibility of the Morosini family. The altar is dedicated to St Andrew (in memory of a deceased son of Vincenzo Morosini) and the altarpiece is by Jacopo and Domenico Tintoretto showing the Risen Christ and St Andrew with Vincenzo Morosini and members of his family.

The altars in the transepts were retained by the monks. In the south transept is a painting by Jacopo and Domenico Tintoretto of the Coronation of the Virgin with Saints.

On the first altar on the right of the nave is the Adoration of the Shepherds by Jacopo Bassano. On the left is the Miracle of the immobility of Santa Lucia (she was condemned to prostitution but by a miracle it was found impossible to move her) by Leandro Bassano.

There are other paintings in the monastery building.

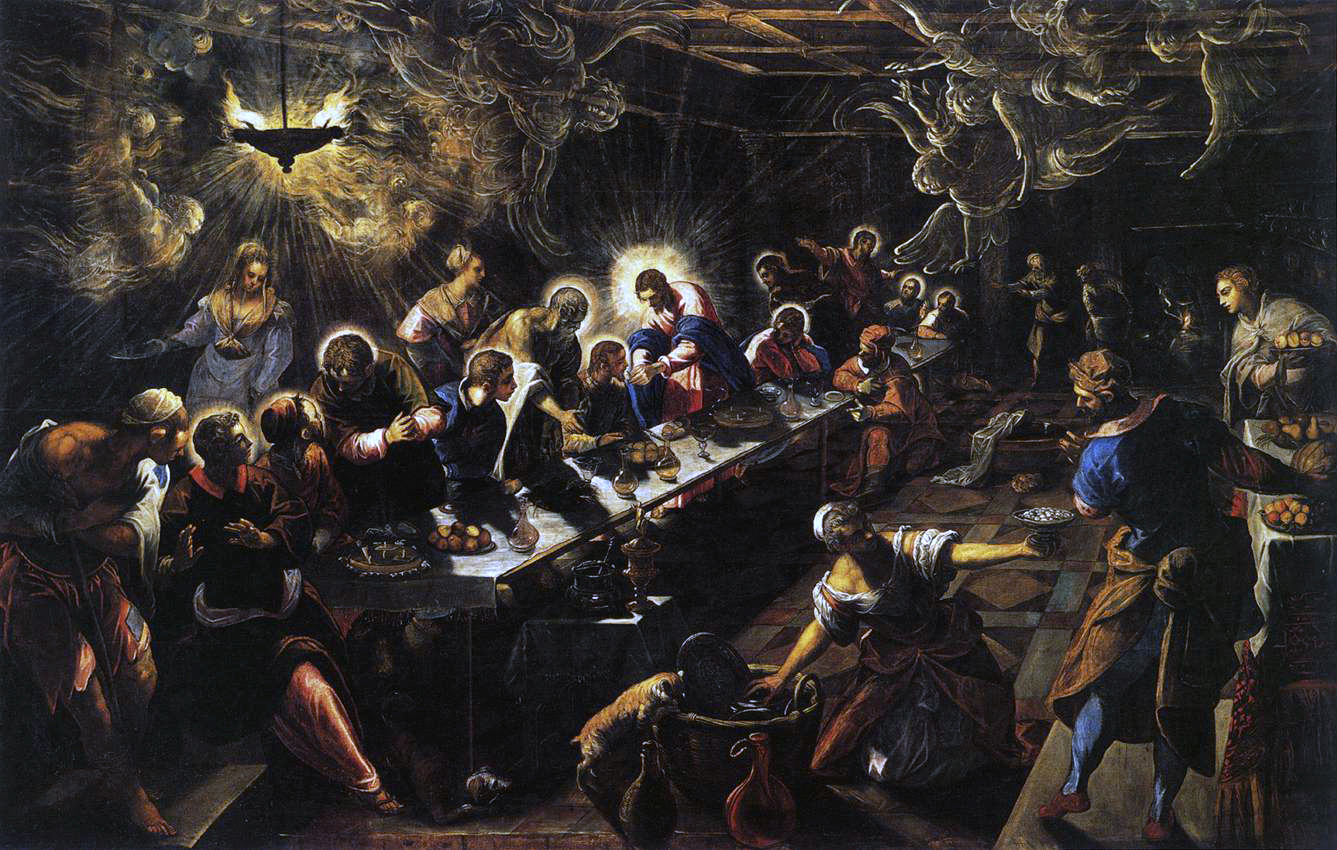
The Last Supper by Jacopo Tintoretto (in the presbytery)

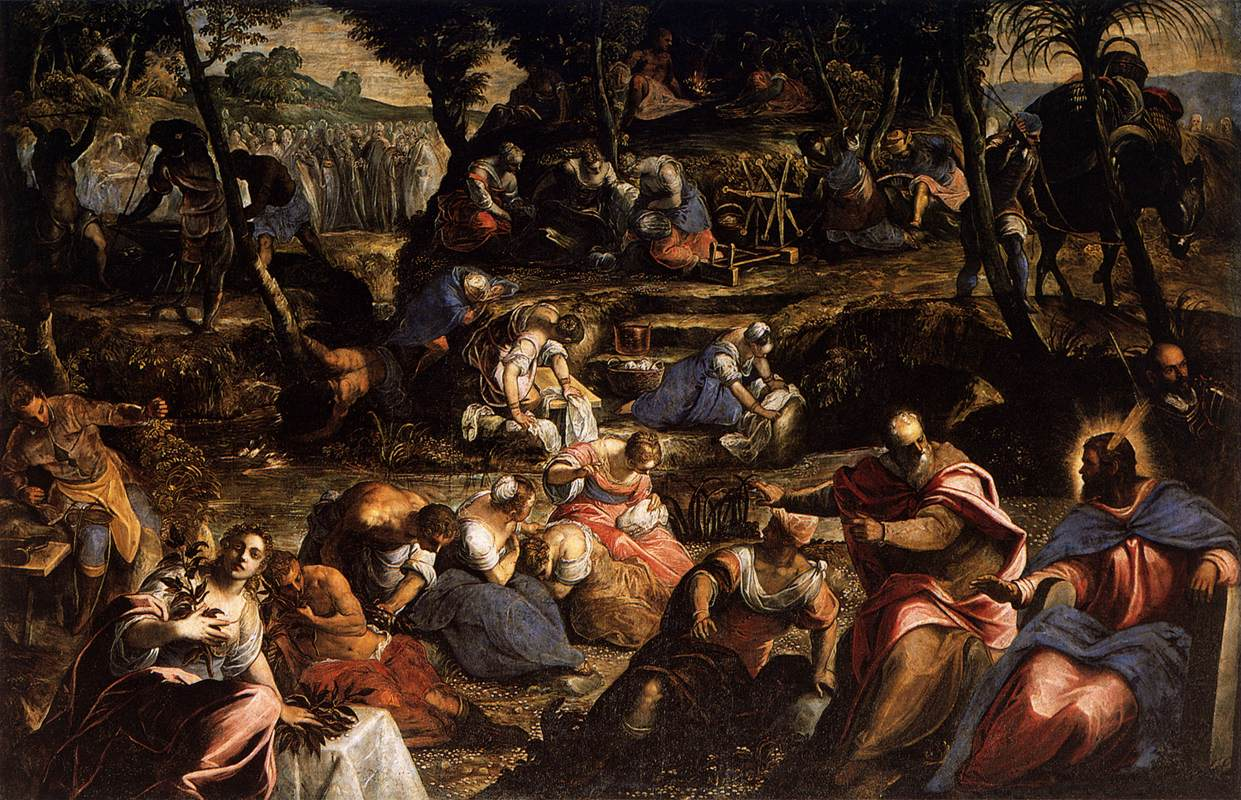
The Jews in the desert by Jacopo Tintoretto (in the presbytery)

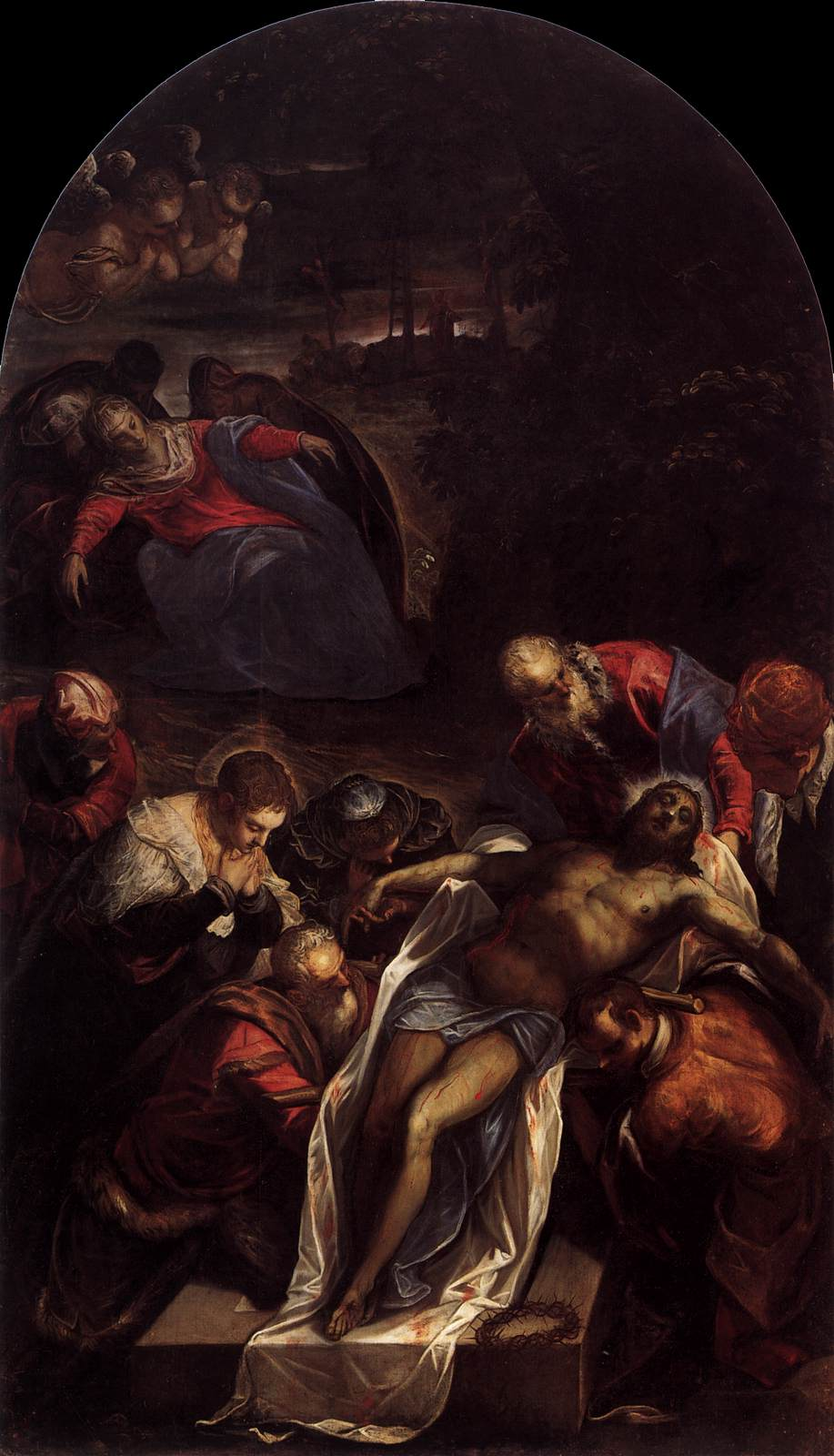
Entombment of Christ by Jacopo Tintoretto (in Cappella dei Morti)

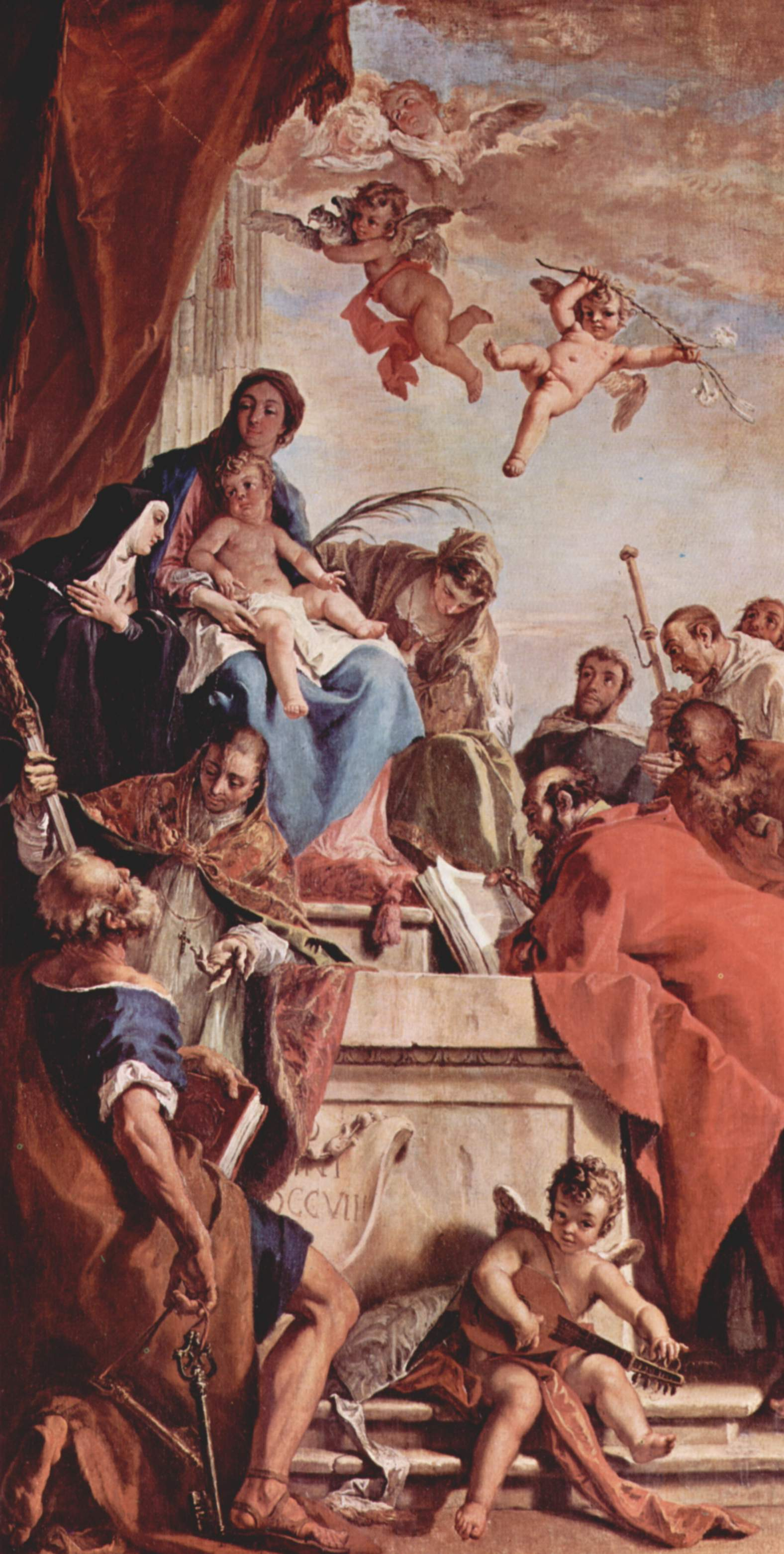
Madonna enthroned with Saints by Sebastiano Ricci (in Bollani chapel to right of high altar)

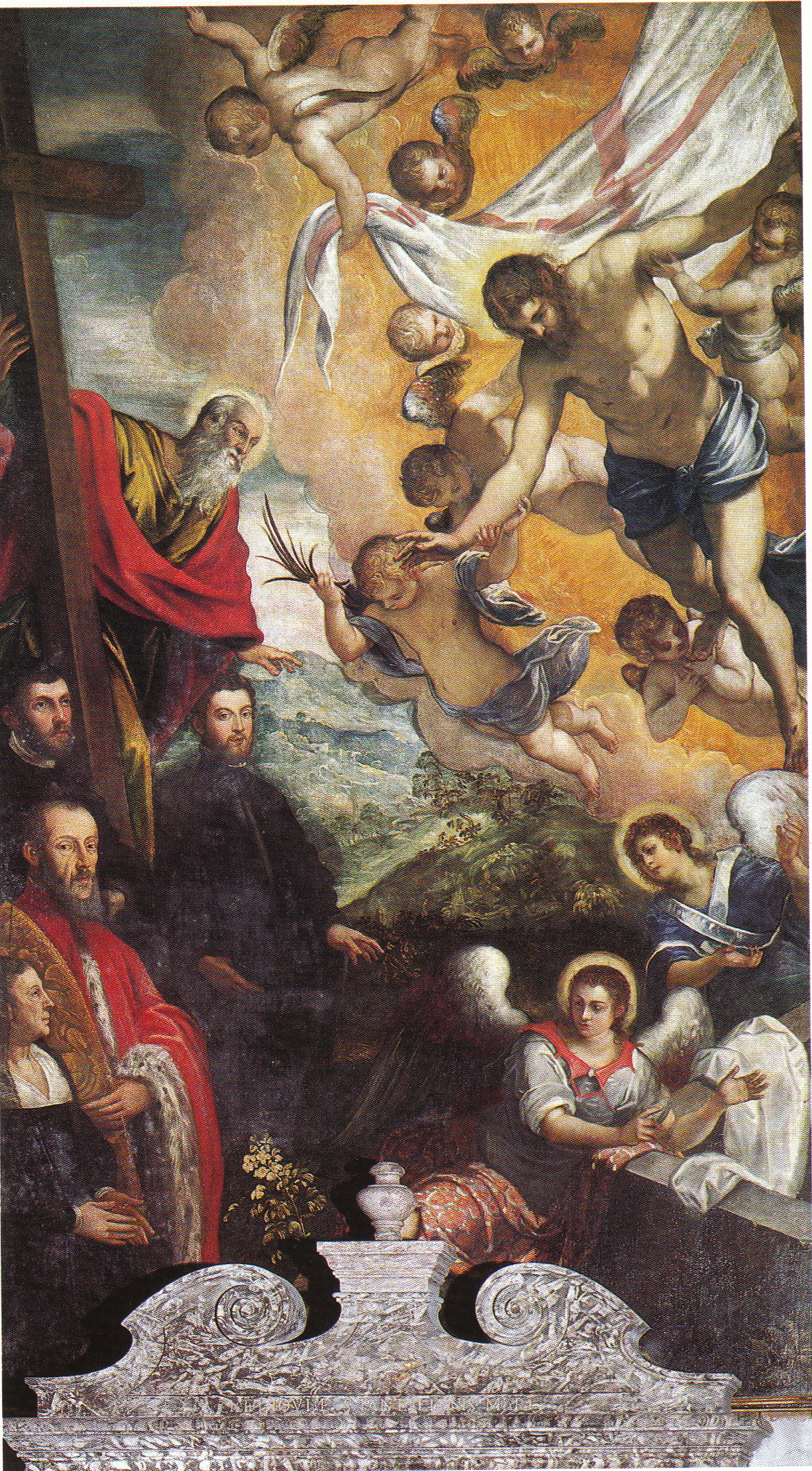
Risen Christ & St Andrew with Morosini family by Jacopo & Domenico Tintoretto (above Morosini altar to left of sanctuary)

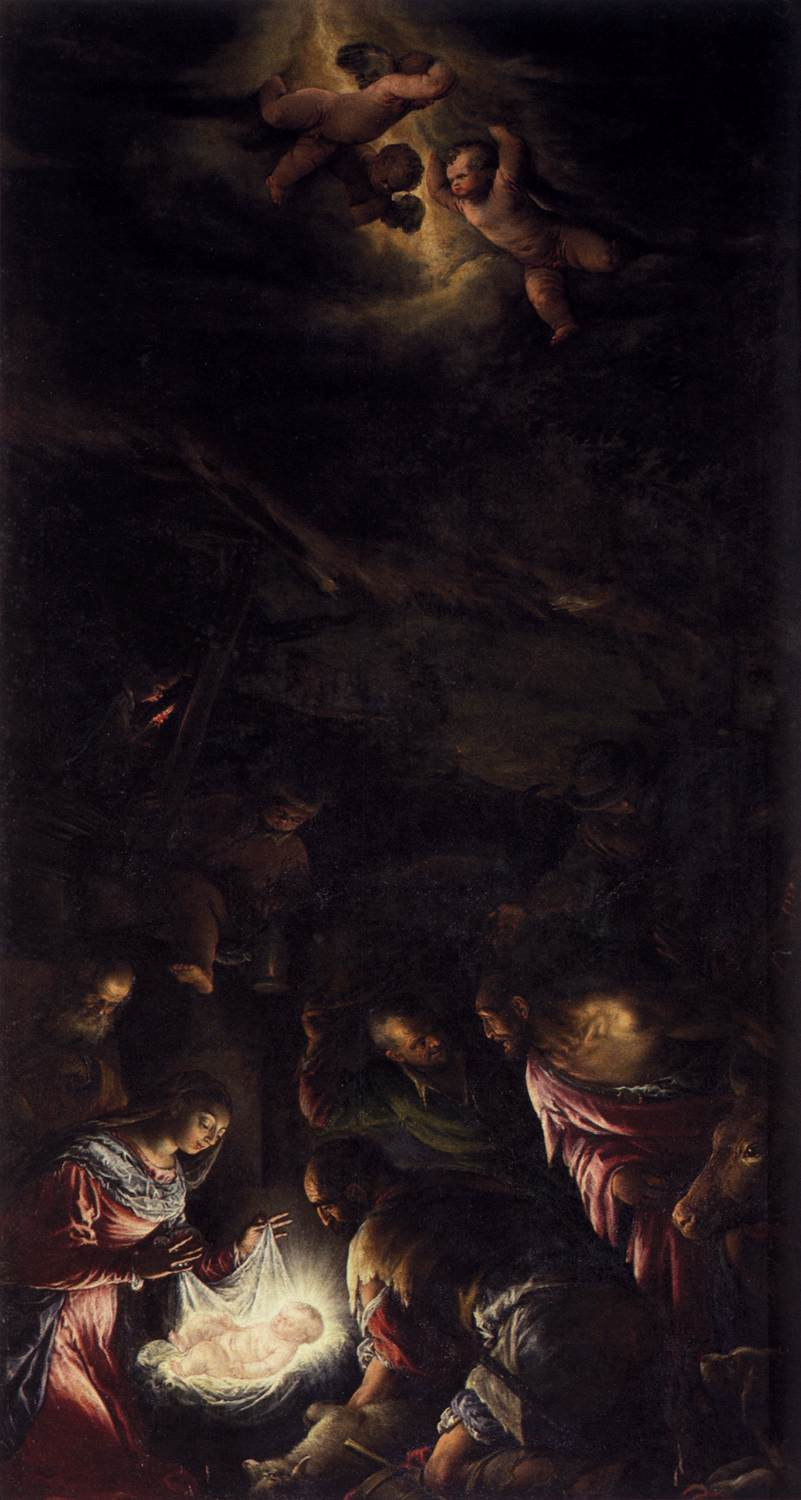
Adoration of the Shepherds by Jacopo Bassano (1st altar on right in the nave)

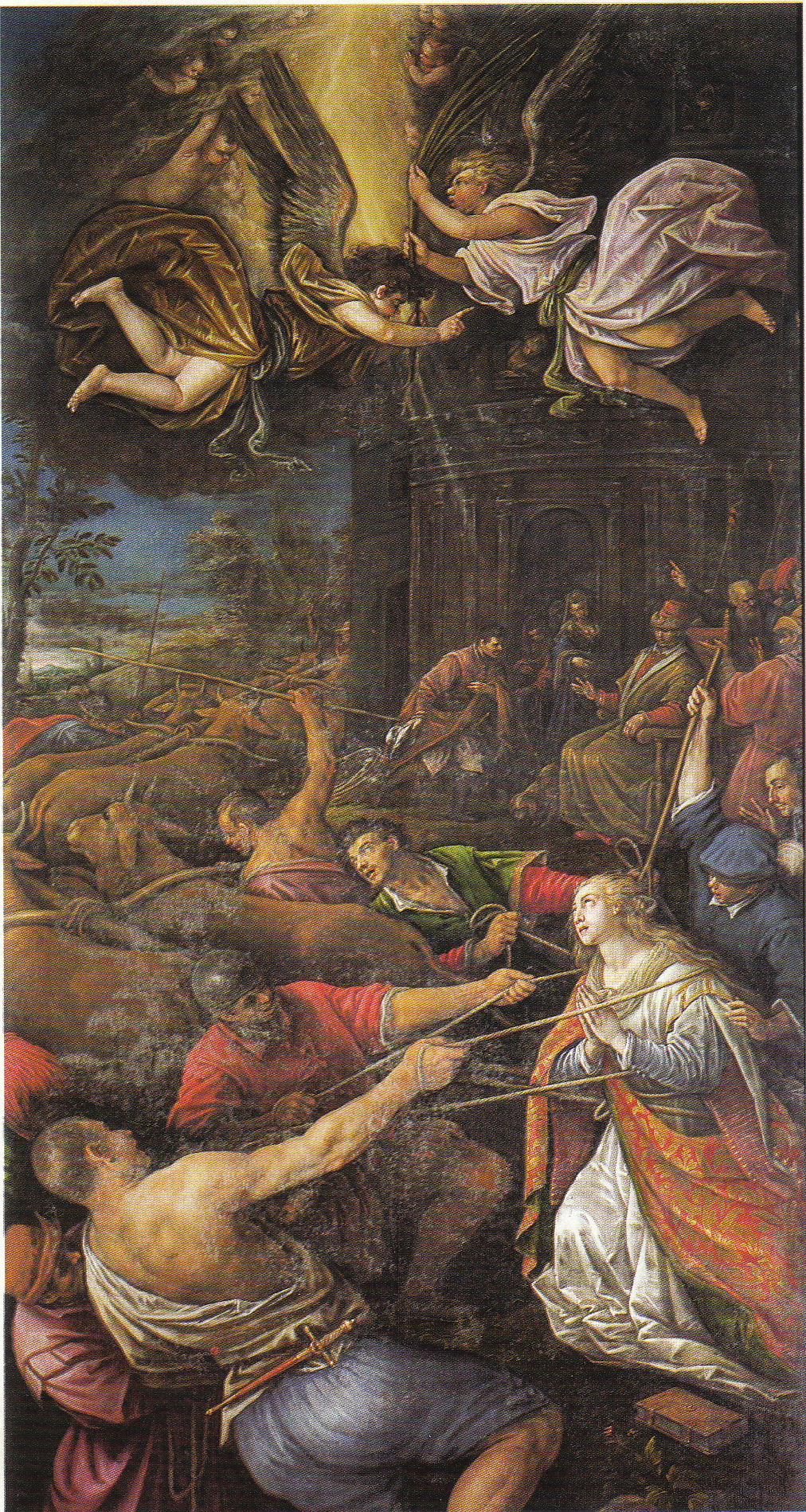
Miracle of the immobility of Sta Lucia by Leandro Bassano (1st altar on left in the nave)

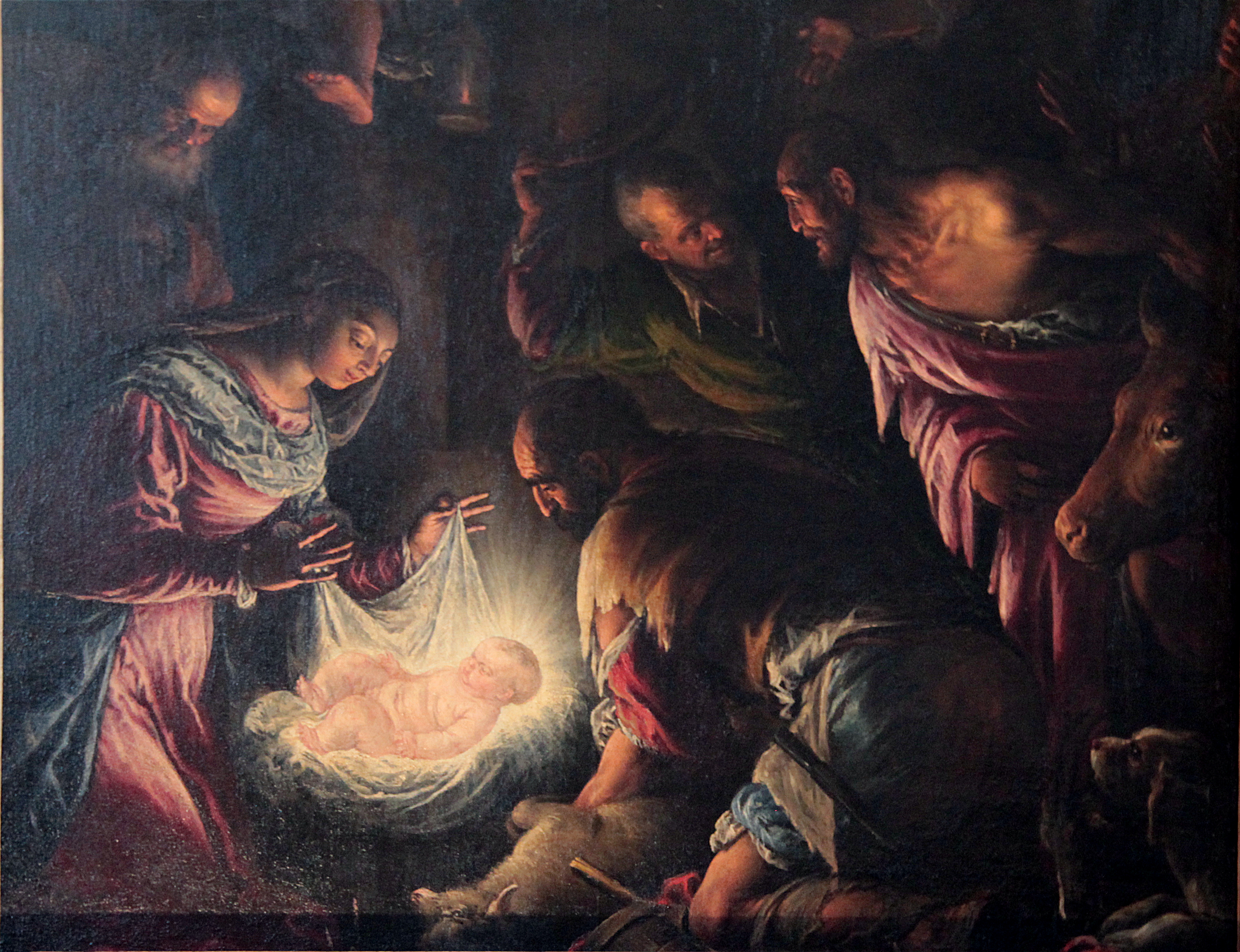
Adorazione dei pastori (Adoration of the Shepherds) by Jacopo Bassano (detail).

== In fiction ==
Edward Morgan Forster mentions San Giorgio Maggiore in the chapter "On Beauty" of his novel A Passage to India, where the novel's hero Cyril Fielding contrasts what he perceives as lack of equilibrium in Indian buildings with the perfection of Italian architecture:

and then came Venice. As he landed on the piazzetta a cup of beauty was lifted to his lips, and he drank with a sense of disloyalty. The buildings of Venice, like the mountains of Crete and the fields of Egypt, stood in the right place, whereas in poor India everything was placed wrong. He had forgotten the beauty of form among idol temples and lumpy hills; indeed, without form, how can there be beauty? Form stammered here and there in a mosque, became rigid through nervousness even, but oh these Italian churches! San Giorgio standing on the island which could scarcely have risen from the waves without it, the Salute holding the entrance of a canal which, but for it, would not be the Grand Canal!

— E. M. Forster, A Passage to India (1924)

Japanese artist Hirohiko Araki features the church in chapter 516 of his long-running manga JoJo's Bizarre Adventure (within the story arc Golden Wind).

== See also ==
- San Giorgio Maggiore (Monet series)
- 16th-century Western domes
- List of buildings and structures in Venice
- List of churches in Venice

== Notes ==
Preceded by Rialto Bridge	Venice landmarks San Giorgio Maggiore	Succeeded by Santa Maria della Salute
