= San Giorgio Maggiore =

Island of Venice

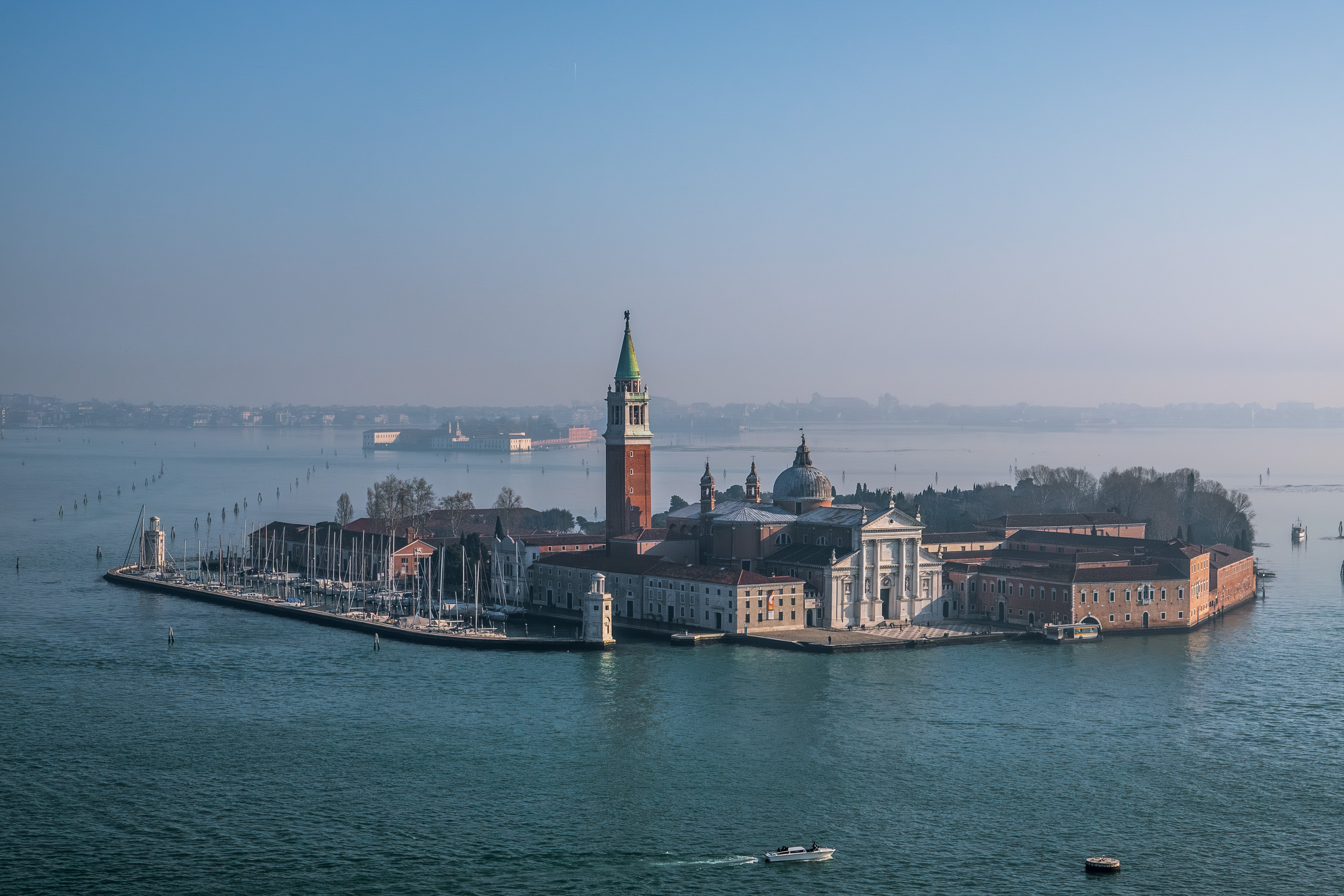
- View of San Giorgio Maggiore from the top of St Mark's Campanile

- Location within Venetian Lagoon

Geography
- Coordinates: 45°25′41″N 12°20′39″E
- Adjacent to: Venetian Lagoon

Administration
- Italy
- Region: Veneto
- Province: Province of Venice

San Giorgio Maggiore (Venetian: San Zorzi Mazor) is one of the islands of Venice, northern Italy, lying east of the Giudecca and south of the main island group. The island, or more specifically its Palladian church, is an important landmark. It has been much painted, featuring, for example, in a series by Monet.

== Location ==
The isle is surrounded by Canale della Grazia, Canale della Giudecca, Saint Mark Basin, Canale di San Marco and the southern lagoon. It forms part of the San Marco sestiere.

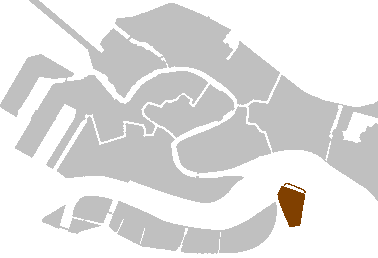
San Giorgio Maggiore within Venice

== History ==
San Giorgio Maggiore was probably occupied in the Roman period; after the foundation of Venice, it was called Insula Memmia after the Memmo family who owned it. By 829, it had a church consecrated to St George; thus, it was designated as San Giorgio Maggiore to be distinguished from San Giorgio in Alga.

The San Giorgio Monastery was established in 982, when the Benedictine monk Giovanni Morosini asked the doge Tribuno Memmo to donate the whole island for a monastery. Morosini drained the island's marshes next to the church to get the ground for building, founded the Monastery of San Giorgio Maggiore, and became its first abbot.

San Giorgio is now best known for the Church of San Giorgio Maggiore, designed by Palladio and begun in 1566. The belltower has a ring of 9 bells in C#.

In the early 19th century, after the Republic fell, the monastery was almost suppressed, and the island became a free port with a new harbour built in 1812. It became the home of Venice's artillery.

== Today ==
San Giorgio Maggiore is now the headquarters of the Cini Foundation arts centre, known for its library, and is also home to the Teatro Verde open-air theatre. In addition, it features two harbours managed by the Compagnia della Vela: Darsena Crose, facing north (see second image below) and Darsena Verde, facing south.

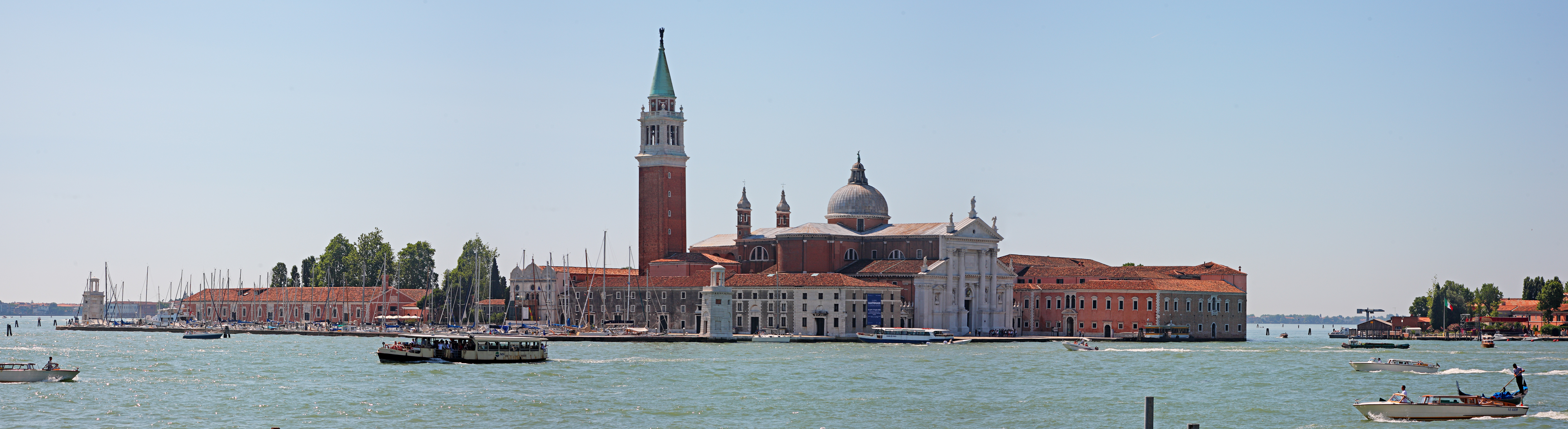
Panorama of San Giorgio Maggiore viewed from the main island
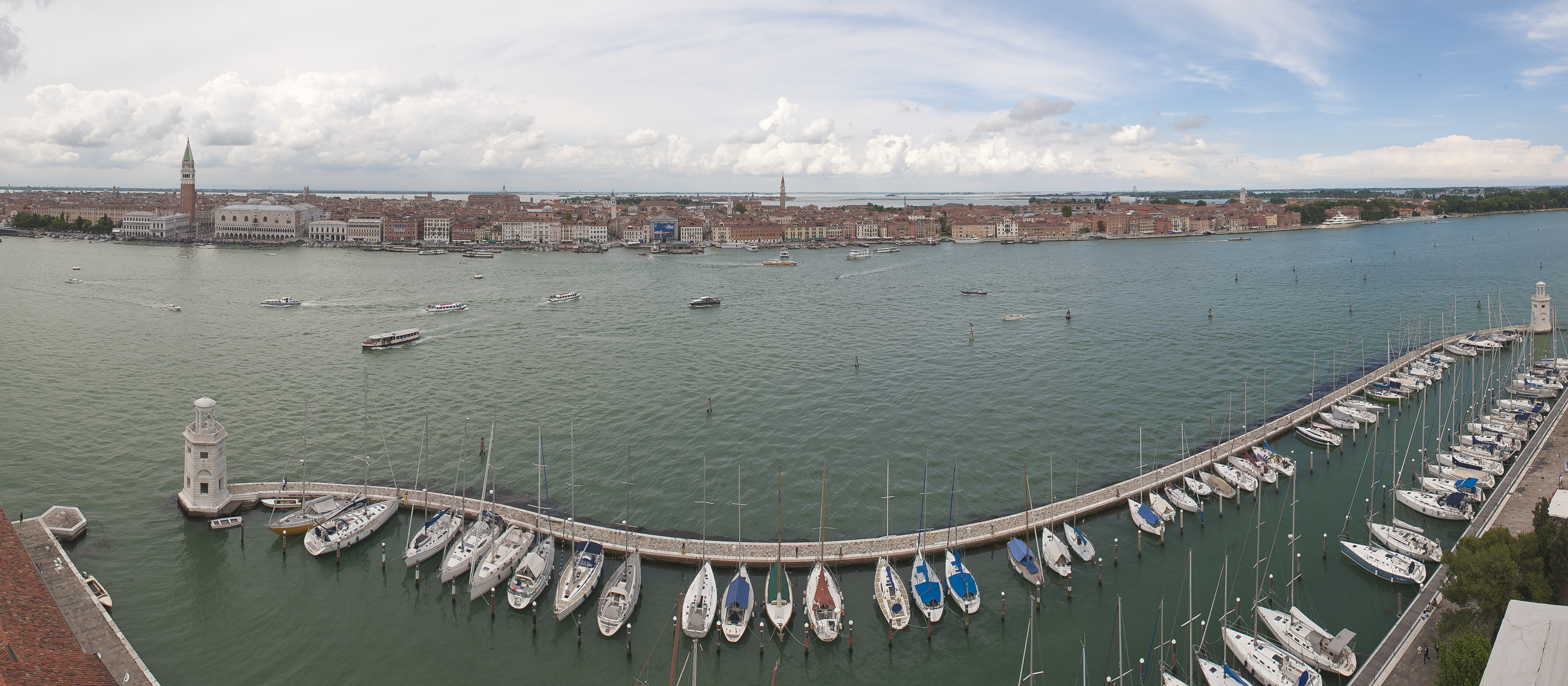
View from the spire to the main island

== In popular culture ==
The island and the church were featured in a pivotal showdown in the anime and manga JoJo's Bizarre Adventure: Vento Aureo.

== See also ==
- San Giorgio Monastery
- Church of San Giorgio Maggiore
- San Giorgio Maggiore (Monet series)
  - San Giorgio Maggiore at Dusk (Painting by Monet)
