= 1908 in France =

- Decades: 1880s; 1890s; 1900s; 1910s; 1920s
- See also: History of France; Timeline of French history; List of years in France

Events from the year 1908 in France.

== Incumbents ==
- President: Armand Fallières
- President of the Council of Ministers: Georges Clemenceau

== Events ==
- 12 January – A long-distance radio message is sent from the Eiffel Tower for the first time.
- 21 March – Henri Farman pilots the first passenger flight.

== Arts ==
- Pierre Bonnard - Nu à contre-jour
- Georges Braque
  - Le Compotier
  - Maisons à l'Estaque
- Raoul Dufy - Arbres à L'Estaque
- Roger de La Fresnaye - Allée des Acacias in the Bois de Boulogne
- Henri Matisse
  - Les Baigneuses à la tortue
  - La Desserte rouge
  - Les Joueurs de boules
  - Portrait de Greta Moll
- Jean Metzinger - Baigneuses
- Claude Monet
  - Le Palais Ducal vu de Saint-Georges Majeur
  - Le Grand Canal
  - Le Palais Ducal

== Film ==
- Charles le Bargy & André Calmettes - L'Assassinat du duc de Guise
- Albert Capellani - L'Arlésienne
- Segundo de Chomón - Excursion dans la lune
- Émile Cohl - Fantasmagorie
- Georges Méliès
  - Le Mariage de Thomas Poirot
  - La Toile d'araignée merveilleuse
  - La Photographie électrique à distance
  - Le Nouveau Seigneur du village
  - Hallucinations pharmaceutiques ou le Truc du potard

== Literature ==
- Henri Barbusse - L'Enfer
- Anatole France - L'île des Pingouins
- Jean de La Hire - La Roue fulgurante
- Maurice Leblanc - Arsène Lupin versus Herlock Sholmes
- Gaston Leroux - Le parfum de la dame en noir
- Maurice Renard - Le Docteur Lerne, sous-dieu

== Music ==
- Isaac Albéniz - Iberia, Livre 4
- Claude Debussy
  - Children's Corner
  - Images, 2e série
- Gabriel Fauré - Sérénade, Op. 98
- Jules Massenet - Espada
- Gabriel Pierné - Ramuntcho
- Maurice Ravel - Rapsodie espagnole
- Camille Saint-Saëns - L'Assassinat du duc de Guise

== Sport ==
- 13 July – Tour de France begins.
- 9 August – Tour de France ends, won by Lucien Petit-Breton.

== Births ==
=== January to March ===
- 9 January – Simone de Beauvoir, author and philosopher (died 1986)
- 12 January – Jean Delannoy, actor, screenwriter and film director (died 2008)
- 26 January – Stéphane Grappelli, jazz violinist (died 1997)
- 31 January – Simonne Mathieu, tennis player (died 1980)
- 11 February – Pierre Hornus, footballer (died 1995)
- 12 February – Jean Effel, painter, illustrator and journalist (died 1982)
- 26 February – Jean-Pierre Wimille, motor racing driver and resistance member (died 1949)
- 27 February – Pierre Brunet, rowing coxswain and Olympic medallist (died 1979)
- 29 February – Balthus, artist (died 2001)
- 5 March – Christian Boussus, tennis player (died 2003)
- 8 March – Raymond Dronne, politician (died 1991)
- 14 March – Maurice Merleau-Ponty, phenomenological philosopher (died 1961)
- 20 March – Roger Trinquier, army officer (died 1986)
- 25 March – Henri Rochereau, politician and European Commissioner (died 1999)

=== April to June ===
- 9 April – Paula Nenette Pepin, composer, pianist and lyricist (died 1990)
- 12 April – André Martinet, linguist (died 1999)
- 21 April – Louis Hostin, weightlifter and Olympic champion (died 1998)
- 5 May – Jacques Massu, General (died 2002)
- 29 May – Pierre-Henri Teitgen, lawyer, professor and politician (died 1997)
- 30 May – André Cheuva, soccer player (died 1989)
- 2 June – Marcel Langiller, international soccer player (died 1980)
- 12 June – Henri Rol-Tanguy, communist and leader in the French Resistance (died 2002)

=== July to September ===
- 2 July – Léon Arthur Elchinger, Bishop of Strasbourg (died 1998)
- 5 July – Henri, comte de Paris, Orléanist claimant to the French throne (died 1999)
- 12 July – Alain Cuny, actor (died 1994)
- 25 July – Robert-Ambroise-Marie Carré, priest and author (died 2004)
- 5 August – Shlomo Pines, French-born Israeli scholar of Jewish and Islamic philosophy (died 1990)
- 18 August – Edgar Faure, politician, essayist, historian, and memoirist (died 1988)
- 22 August – Henri Cartier-Bresson, photographer (died 2004)
- 28 August – Robert Merle, novelist (died 2004)
- 2 September – Fania Fénelon, pianist, composer and cabaret singer (died 1983)
- 8 September – Luc Étienne (Périn), writer (died 1984).
- 19 September – Paul Bénichou, writer, critic and literary historian (died 2001)
- 19 September – Robert Lecourt, jurist, fourth President of the European Court of Justice (died 2004)
- 25 September – Jacqueline Audry, film director (died 1977)
- 25 September – Roger Beaufrand, Olympic gold medal-winning cyclist (died 2007)

=== October to December ===
- 30 October – Marcel Béalu, writer (died 1993)
- 1 November – Sylvia Bataille, actress (died 1993)
- 4 November – Pauline Trigère, fashion designer (died 2002)
- 6 November – Françoise Dolto, physician and psychoanalyst (died 1988)
- 16 November – Emmanuelle Cinquin, religious sister (died 2008)
- 19 November – Jean-Yves Daniel-Lesur, organist and composer (died 2002)
- 24 November – Simone de la Chaume, golfer (died 2001).
- 10 December – Olivier Messiaen, composer, organist and ornithologist (died 1992)
- 17 December – Raymond Louviot, cyclist (died 1969)
- 31 December – Pauline de Rothschild, fashion icon and tastemaker (died 1976)

=== Full date unknown ===
- Gilbert Degrémont, water treatment expert (died 1974)
- Célestin Lainé, Breton nationalist and collaborator (died 1983)

== Deaths ==
- 29 January – François-Marie-Benjamin Richard, Archbishop of Paris (born 1819)
- 13 April Victor André Cornil, pathologist (born 1837)
- 7 May – Ludovic Halévy, author and playwright (born 1834)
- 14 August – Jules Liégeois, jurist, member of the Nancy School of Hypnosis (born 1833)
- 25 August – Henri Becquerel, physicist, Nobel Prize laureate (born 1852)
- 14 November – Denis Jean Achille Luchaire, historian (born 1846)
- 20 November – Marie-Louis-Antoine-Gaston Boissier, classical scholar (born 1823)
- 27 November – Jean Albert Gaudry, geologist and palaeontologist (born 1827)
- 5 December – Ernest Hébert, painter (born 1817)
- Full date unknown – Jacques-Eugène Feyen, painter (born 1815)
