= 1911 in France =

- Decades: 1890s; 1900s; 1910s; 1920s; 1930s
- See also: History of France; Timeline of French history; List of years in France

Events from the year 1911 in France.

== Incumbents ==
- President: Armand Fallières
- President of the Council of Ministers:
  - until 2 March: Aristide Briand
  - 2 March-27 June: Ernest Monis
  - starting 27 June: Joseph Caillaux

== Events ==
- January – Champagne Riots begin.
- 19 May – Maurice Ravel's opera L'heure espagnole is premièred at the Opéra-Comique in Paris.
- 13 June – Igor Stravinsky's ballet Petrushka is premièred at the Théâtre du Châtelet in Paris by Sergei Diaghilev's Ballets Russes with Vaslav Nijinsky in the lead.
- 14 June – British liner RMS Olympic call at Cherbourg on her maiden transatlantic voyage.
- 1 July – Agadir Crisis.
- 21 August – Leonardo da Vinci's Mona Lisa is stolen from the Louvre museum in Paris by Vincenzo Peruggia; the theft is discovered the following morning. The thief is arrested and the painting returned from Italy in 1913. Among the suspects is Guillaume Apollinaire.
- 25 September – French battleship Liberté explodes at anchor in Toulon, killing around 300 onboard and in the surrounding area.
- 4 November – Morocco–Congo Treaty brings the Agadir Crisis to a close. This treaty leads Morocco to be split between France (as a protectorate) and Spain (as the colony of Spanish Sahara), with Germany forfeiting all claims to the country. In return, France gives Germany a portion of the French Congo (as Kamerun) and Germany cedes some of German Kamerun to France (as Chad).
- 20 December – First robbery by the Bonnot gang.

== Literature ==
- Marcel Allain & Pierre Souvestre - Fantômas
- André Gide - Isabelle
- Jean de La Hire - Le Mystère des XV
- Alfred Jarry - Exploits and Opinions of Dr. Faustroll, Pataphysician
- Valery Larbaud - Fermina Márquez

== Music ==
- Claude Debussy - Le Martyre de saint Sébastien
- Gabriel Fauré - 9 Préludes, Op. 103
- Maurice Ravel
  - L'heure espagnole
  - Valses nobles et sentimentales
- Erik Satie
  - En habit de cheval
  - Trois Morceaux en forme de poire
  - Sarabandes
- Igor Stravinsky - Pétrouchka
- Nikolai Tcherepnin - Narcisse et Echo

== Births ==
=== January to June ===
- 5 January – Jean-Pierre Aumont, actor (died 2001)
- 15 January – Jean Talairach, neurosurgeon (died 2007)
- 16 January – Roger Lapébie, cyclist, won the 1937 Tour de France (died 1996)
- 17 January – André-Georges Haudricourt, anthropologist and linguist (died 1996)
- 18 January – Charles Delaunay, author, jazz expert, co-founder and long-term leader of the Hot club de France (died 1988)
- 22 January – André Roussin, playwright (died 1987)
- 24 January – René Barjavel, author, journalist and critic (died 1985)
- 30 January – René Duverger, weightlifter and Olympic gold medallist (died 1983)
- 2 February – Jean-Jacques Grunenwald, organist, composer and architect (died 1982)
- 14 February – Jean-Louis Nicot, Air Force officer involved in the Algiers putsch (died 2004)
- 23 February – Pierre Meile, French linguist (died 1963)
- 7 April – Hervé Bazin, writer (died 1996)
- 9 April – Paul Coste-Floret, politician (died 1979)
- 10 April – Maurice Schumann, politician (died 1998)
- 2 May – Edmond Pagès, cyclist (died 1987)
- 17 May – André Jaunet, flautist (died 1988)
- 24 May – Michel Pécheux, fencer (died 1985)
- 6 June – Jean Cayrol, poet and publisher (died 2005)
- 15 June – Joseph Alcazar, international soccer player (died 1979)
- 22 June – Michel Dens, baritone (died 2000)
- 29 June – Lucien Lauk, racing cyclist (died 2001)

=== July to September ===
- 5 July – Georges Pompidou, President of France (died 1974)
- 23 July – Jean Fontenay, cyclist (died 1975)
- 1 August – André Guinier, physicist (died 2000)
- 11 August – Louis Dumont, anthropologist (died 1998)
- 18 August – Jacques Wertheimer, businessman (died 1996)
- 25 August – André Leroi-Gourhan, archaeologist, paleontologist, paleoanthropologist and anthropologist (died 1986)
- 7 September – Henri de France, pioneering television inventor (died 1986)
- 10 September – Renée Simonot, actress (died 2021)

=== October to December ===
- 12 October – Louis de Guiringaud, politician and Minister (died 1982)
- 13 October – André Navarra, cellist and cello teacher (died 1988)
- 19 October – Laurette Séjourné, archeologist and ethnologist (died 2003)
- 31 October – René Hardy, French Resistance worker (died 1987)
- 1 November – Henri Troyat, author, biographer, historian and novelist (died 2007)
- 7 November – Yolande Beekman, World War II heroine (executed) (died 1944)
- 22 November – Georges Bégué, engineer and Special Operations Executive agent (died 1993)
- 26 November – Robert Marchand, cyclist (died 2021)
- 8 December – Sauveur Ducazeaux, cyclist (died 1987)
- 21 December – Yves Godard, military officer (died 1975)
- 25 December – Louise Bourgeois, artist and sculptor (died 2010)
- 28 December – Gustave Malécot, mathematician (died 1998)
- 29 December – Bernard Saint-Hillier, General (died 2004)
- 29 December – André Claveau, recording artist; singer (died 2003)

=== Full date unknown ===
- Louis Henry, historian (died 1991)
- Claude Saint-Cyr, milliner (died 2002)

== Deaths ==
- 13 February – Alphonse Pinart, explorer, philologist, and ethnographer (born 1852)
- 17 February – Auguste Houzeau, agronomist and chemist (born 1829)
- 24 March – Rodolphe-Madeleine Cleophas Dareste de la Chavanne, jurist (born 1824)
- 29 March – Alexandre Guilmant, organist and composer (born 1837)
- 7 June – Maurice Rouvier, statesman (born 1842)
- 18 July – Jules Bourgeois, entomologist (born 1847)
- 11 September – Louis Henri Boussenard, author of adventure novels (born 1847)
- 30 September – Louis Joseph Troost, chemist (born 1825)
- 7 October – Marie Clément Gaston Gautier, botanist (born 1841)
- 8 December – Alphonse Legros, painter and etcher (born 1837)
