= 1909 in France =

- Decades: 1880s; 1890s; 1900s; 1910s; 1920s
- See also: History of France; Timeline of French history; List of years in France

Events from the year 1909 in France.

== Incumbents ==
- President: Armand Fallières
- President of the Council of Ministers: Georges Clemenceau (until 24 July), Aristide Briand (starting 24 July)

== Events ==
- 20 February - The Futurist Manifesto, written by Italian Filippo Marinetti, is published in Le Figaro.
- 2 February - The Paris Film Congress opens. It is an attempt to form a cartel of leading European producers similar to that of the MPPC in the United States
- 18 April - Joan of Arc is beatified in Rome.
- 25 July - Louis Bleriot is the first man to fly across the English Channel in a heavier-than-air craft.
- 30 July – Société Française de teintures inoffersires, as predecessor of L'Oréal was founded.
- 22 September - Three of the Chauffeurs de la Drome are executed by guillotine in Valence, Drôme in south-west France. They were a gang responsible for a three-year campaign of theft, torture and murder in the department of Drôme.

== Arts ==
- Georges Braque
  - Barques de pêche
  - Le Compotier
  - Mandora
- Albert Gleizes - Bords de la Marne
- Henri Matisse - Nu assis
- Francis Picabia - Caoutchouc
- Pablo Picasso - Femme à l'éventail
- Henri Rousseau
  - Les Rives de la Bièvre près de Bicêtre
  - La Muse inspirant le poète
- Paul Signac - Le Pin de Bertaud Gassin
- Suzanne Valadon - Adam et Ève

== Film ==
- André Calmettes - Macbeth
- Segundo de Chomón - Pickpock ne craint pas les entraves
- Georges Méliès
  - Le Locataire diabolique
  - Hydrothérapie fantastique
  - Le Génie des cloches ou le Fils du sonneur
  - Papillon fantastique

== Literature ==
- Maurice Barrès - Colette Baudoche
- André Gide - La porte étroite
- Maurice Leblanc - L'Aiguille creuse

== Music ==
- Frédéric Chopin - Les Sylphides (orch. Alexander Glazunov)
- Claude Debussy
  - Le petit nègre
  - Chansons de Charles d’Orléans
- Paul Dukas - Vocalise-étude
- Georges Enesco - Piano Quartet No. 1
- Manuel de Falla - Pièces espagnoles
- Gabriel Fauré - Impromptu No. 5
- Jules Massenet - Bacchus
- Maurice Ravel - Gaspard de la nuit
- Camille Saint-Saëns - Le matin, Op. 129

== Sport ==
- 5 July - Tour de France begins.
- 1 August - Tour de France ends, won by François Faber of Luxembourg.

== Births ==
=== January to March ===
- 3 February
  - André Cayatte, filmmaker (died 1989)
  - Simone Weil, philosopher and social activist (died 1943)
- 10 February - Henri Alekan, cinematographer (died 2001)
- 26 February
  - Claude Cahen, orientalist (died 1991)
  - Michel Tapié, artist, critic, curator and art collector (died 1987)
- 7 March - Léo Malet, novelist (died 1996)
- 14 March
  - Pierre Cloarec, cyclist (died 1994)
  - André Pieyre de Mandiargues, writer (died 1991)
- 27 March - Raymond Oliver, chef and restaurateur (died 1990)
- 31 March - Robert Brasillach, author, executed for collaboration (died 1945)

=== April to June ===
- 7 April - Robert Charroux, writer (died 1978)
- 17 April - Alain Poher, politician (died 1996)
- 22 April - André Girard, civil servant and Resistance worker (died 1993)
- 11 May - René Bousquet, civil servant, served as secretary general of the Vichy regime police (died 1993)
- 21 May - Guy de Rothschild, banker (died 2007)
- 15 June - Pierre La Mure, author (died 1976)
- 17 June - Régine Pernoud, historian and medievalist (died 1998)
- 19 June - Robert Défossé, soccer player (died 1973)

=== July to September ===
- 6 July - Jean Taris, swimmer and Olympic medallist (died 1977)
- 8 July - Louis Finot, international soccer player (died 1996)
- 13 July - Marie-Thérèse Walter, mistress of Pablo Picasso (died 1977)
- 15 July - Jean Hamburger, physician, surgeon and essayist (died 1992)
- 26 July - Bernard Cornut-Gentille, administrator and politician (died 1992)
- 5 August - Pierre Guillaumat, politician and Minister (died 1991)
- 11 August - Gaston Litaize, organist and composer (died 1991)
- 25 September - Marc-Gilbert Sauvajon, film director, script-writer, playwright and author (died 1985)
- 27 September - Pascal Themanlys, poet, Zionist and Kabbalist (died 2000)
- 29 September - Jules Merviel, cyclist (died 1976)
- September - Henri Déricourt, pilot and accused double agent (died 1962)

=== October to December ===
- 1 October - Thierry Maulnier, journalist, essayist, dramatist and literary critic (died 1988)
- 11 October - François Tanguy-Prigent, politician and resistance fighter (died 1970)
- 14 October - Robert Mercier, footballer (died 1958)
- 28 October - Claude Bourdet, writer, journalist and politician (died 1996)
- 5 November - Pierre Repp, humorist and actor (died 1986)
- 8 November - Marie-Madeleine Fourcade, French Resistance leader (born 1989)
- 29 November - Jean Leguay, civil servant, accomplice in the deportation of Jews from France (died 1989)
- 2 December - Pierre Langlais, military officer (died 1986)

=== Full date unknown ===
- Marcel Barral, poet (died 1997)

== Deaths ==
- 18 March - Cécile Bruyère, abbess (born 1845)
- 28 May - Désiré-Magloire Bourneville, neurologist (born 1840)
