= 1908 in art =

Events from the year 1908 in art.

== Events ==
- January 20 – Hugh Lane opens the Dublin City Gallery, the world's first to display only modern art.
- February – The Ashcan School ("the Eight") give their first and only exhibition, opening at the Macbeth Gallery in New York.
- March 20–May 2 – Salon des Indépendants in Paris gives rise to the term "Cubism" (cubisme).
- May – Sergey Prokudin-Gorsky produces a color photographic portrait of Leo Tolstoy.
- July – Allied Artists' Association holds its first exhibition, at the Royal Albert Hall in London.
- July 29 – The Whitworth Art Gallery building in Manchester (England) is formally opened.
- Autumn – Edvard Munch suffers a nervous breakdown and enters a clinic in Copenhagen.
- November – Georges Braque exhibits at Daniel-Henry Kahnweiler's Paris gallery; critic Louis Vauxcelles describes him as "reducing everything... to geometric schemas, to cubes."
- Paul Ranson founds the Académie Ranson in Paris.
- The British Medical Association Building, London, designed by Charles Holden with eighteen controversial nude sculptures by Jacob Epstein, is completed.
- Wassily Kandinsky settles in the Bavarian town of Murnau am Staffelsee and begins a series of paintings inspired by the local landscape.
- The Academy of Fine Arts Vienna rejects (for the second time) Adolf Hitler's application to study painting.
- Australian painter Arthur Streeton marries violinist Nora Clench.

== Works ==
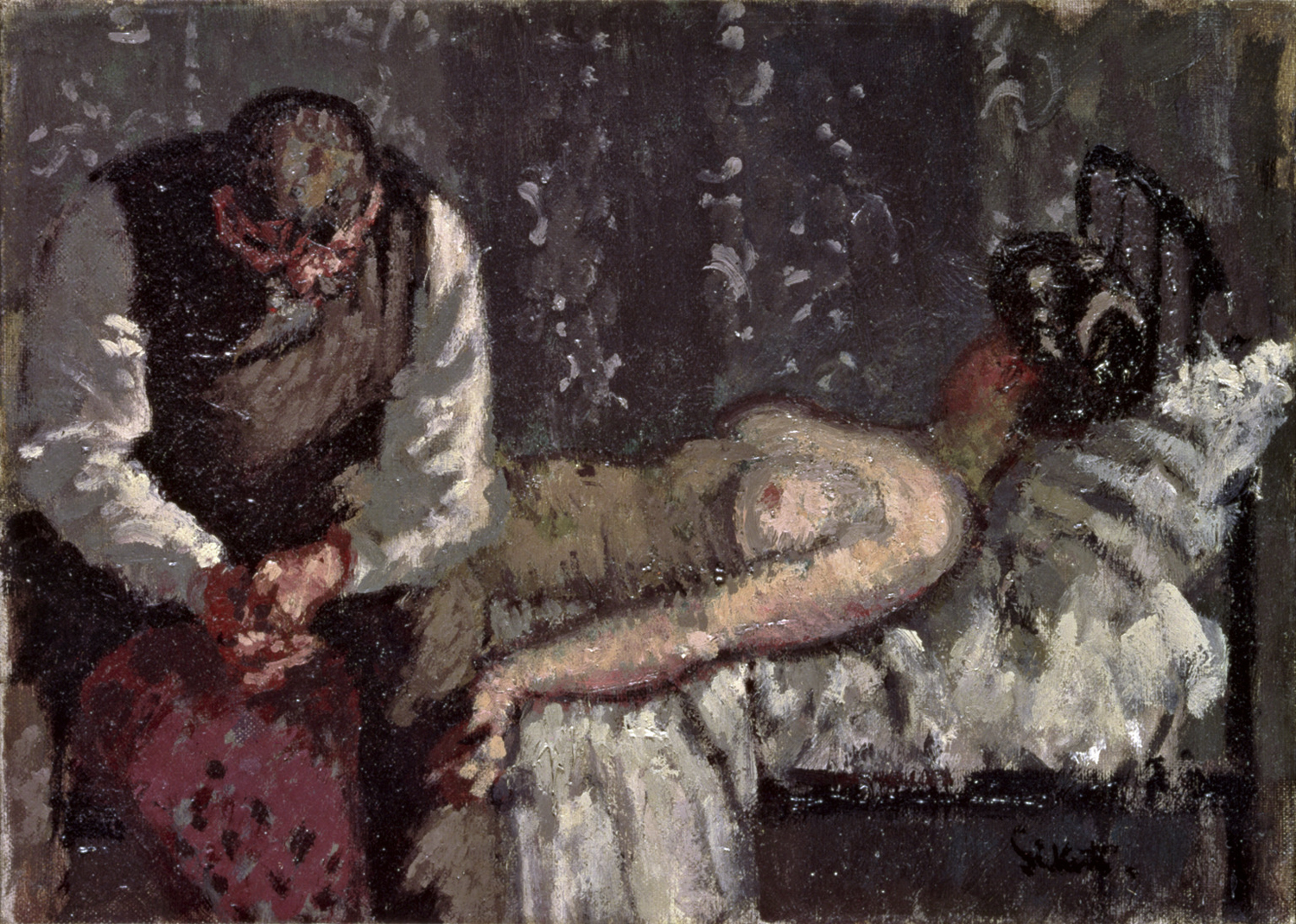
Walter Sickert, What Shall We Do for the Rent?, from The Camden Town Murder series

- George Bellows – Steaming Streets
- László Beszédes – Joseph (slave) (sculpture)
- Giovanni Boldini - Marchesa Luisa Casati, with a greyhound
- Pierre Bonnard – Woman in a Blue Hat
- Constantin Brâncuși
  - The Kiss (sculpture)
  - The Wisdom of the Earth (wood sculpture)
- Georges Braque
  - Houses at l'Estaque
  - Le Viaduc de L'Estaque
- Mikalojus Konstantinas Čiurlionis
  - Fantasy (triptych)
  - Prelude and Fugue (diptych )
  - Sonatas
    - Sonata of the Pyramids
    - Sonata of the Sea
    - Sonata of the Serpent
    - Sonata of the Summer
    - Sonata of the Stars
- Henri-Edmond Cross – Cypresses at Cagnes
- Cyrus Edwin Dallin – Appeal to the Great Spirit (bronze)
- Roger de La Fresnaye - Allée des Acacias in the Bois de Boulogne
- André Derain – Landscape in Provence
- Herbert James Draper – The Water Nymph
- John Duncan – Helene Schlapp – Iona
- Thomas Eakins – William Rush and His Model (two versions)
- Daniel Chester French – Statue of George Frisbie Hoar
- Florence Fuller – Portrait of Deborah Vernon Hackett (approximate date)
- J. W. Godward
  - A Classical Lady
  - A Grecian Girl
  - Ismenia
- Erich Heckel – Weisses Haus in Dangast
- Lewis Hine – Girl Worker in a Carolina Cotton Mill (photograph)
- Edward Robert Hughes – Midsummer Eve
- Ernst Ludwig Kirchner – Street, Dresden
- Gustav Klimt –
  - The Kiss
  - Schloss by the Water
- Laura Knight – The Beach
- Carl Larsson – Gustav Vasas intåg i Stockholm 1523 (Nationalmuseum)
- Henri Matisse
  - Bathers with a Turtle
  - The Dessert: Harmony in Red ("The Red Room")
  - Game of Bowls
  - Portrait of Greta Moll
- Amedeo Modigliani – The Jewess
- Piet Mondrian – Avond
- Claude Monet – paintings of Venice
  - The Doge's Palace Seen from San Giorgio Maggiore
  - Le Grand Canal
  - Le Grand Canal et Santa Maria della Salute
  - Le Palais Ducal (a series of three paintings)
  - Palace From Molo, Venice
  - San Giorgio Maggiore at Dusk
- Mikhail Nesterov – Portrait of B. M. Nesterov
- William Ordway Partridge – Statue of Alexander Hamilton (sculpture, New York City)
- Pierre-Auguste Renoir – Portrait of Ambroise Vollard
- John Singer Sargent – Portrait of Arthur Balfour
- Otto Schumann – Lewis and Clark Memorial Column (Portland, Oregon)
- Carl Seffner – Statue of Johann Sebastian Bach (outside St. Thomas Church, Leipzig)
- Walter Sickert – The Camden Town Murder (group of paintings)
- Marianne Stokes – Madonna and Child
- Pedro Subercaseaux
  - Cabildo abierto del 22 de mayo de 1810
  - Mariano Moreno en su mesa de trabajo
- Sydney Curnow Vosper – Salem
- John Walz – Nathan Bedford Forrest Monument (Rome, Georgia)
- J. W. Waterhouse – Gather Ye Rosebuds While Ye May

== Births ==
=== January to June ===
- January 18 – Humberto Rosa, painter (d. 1982)
- February 12 – Jean Effel, French painter, caricaturist, illustrator and journalist (d. 1948)
- February 26 – Tex Avery, American animator, cartoonist, and director (d. 1980).
- February 28 – William Coldstream, English realist painter (d. 1987).
- February 29 – Balthus, French modern artist (d. 2001)
- March 13
  - Rita Angus, New Zealand painter (d. 1970)
  - Maria Helena Vieira da Silva, Portuguese-French abstract painter (d. 1992)
- March 19 – George Rodger, English photographer (d. 1995)
- March 23 – Cecil Collins, English painter and printmaker (d. 1989)
- May 9 – Mary Scheier, American sculptor and academic (d. 2007)
- May 16 – Anne Bonnet, Belgian painter (d. 1960)
- June 24 – Helen Lundeberg, American painter (d. 1999)

=== July to December ===
- July 6 – Sam Vanni, Finnish painter (d. 1992)
- July 8 – Kaii Higashiyama, Japanese painter and writer (d. 1999)
- July 9 – Minor White, American photographer (d. 1976).
- July 22 – Claire Falkenstein, American sculptor and painter (d. 1997).
- August 22 – Henri Cartier-Bresson, French photographer (d. 2004).
- August 28
  - Edith Tudor Hart, born Edith Suschitzky, Austrian-born photojournalist and communist agent in Britain (d. 1973).
  - Roger Tory Peterson, American naturalist, ornithologist, artist and educator (d. 1996).
- September 6 – Korczak Ziolkowski, Polish American sculptor (d. 1982).
- September 14 – Peter Watson, English arts benefactor (k. 1956)
- October 1 – Nicholas Marsicano, American painter (d. 1991).
- October 21 – Jorge Oteiza, Spanish sculptor, painter, designer and writer (d. 2003).
- October 27 – Lee Krasner, American abstract expressionist painter (d. 1984).
- November 4 – EQ Nicholson, born Elsie Q. Myers, English textile designer and painter (d. 1992).
- November 19 – Gisèle Freund, born Gisela Freund, German-born photographer (d. 2000).
- December 3 – Victor Pasmore, English artist and architect (d. 1998).
- December 23 – Yousuf Karsh, Armenian-Canadian photographer (d. 2002).

=== Full date unknown ===
- Madiha Omar, Iraqi artist (d. 2005)
- Myron Stout, American abstract painter (d. 1987)
- Umaña, Colombian artist (d. 1994).

== Deaths ==
- January 9 – Wilhelm Busch, German humorist, poet, illustrator and painter (born 1832)
- January 13 – Hashimoto Gahō, Japanese painter of the Kanō school (b. 1835)
- January 19 – Roberto Bompiani, Italian painter and sculptor (b. 1821)
- January 28 – Sidney Paget, British illustrator (b. 1860)
- April 13 – Aasta Hansteen, Norwegian painter, writer, and early feminist (b. 1824)
- June 1 – Allen Butler Talcott, American painter (b. 1867)
- July 17 - Joseph Henderson, Scottish landscape painter (b. 1832)
- August 30 – Giovanni Fattori, Italian painter and printmaker (b. 1825)
- November 3 – Harro Magnussen, German sculptor (born 1861)
- November 4 – Richard Gerstl, Austrian painter and draughtsman (b. 1883)
- November 24 – Charles Henry Turner, American watercolourist and oil painter (b. 1848)
- December 5 – Ernest Hébert, French painter (b. 1817)
- December 27 – František Bohumír Zvěřina, Czech painter (b. 1835)
- date unknown
  - Leopoldo Costoli, Italian sculptor (b. 1850)
  - George Earl, British painter of sporting animals (b. 1824)
