= 1910 in France =

- Decades: 1890s; 1900s; 1910s; 1920s; 1930s
- See also: History of France; Timeline of French history; List of years in France

This is a list of events from the year 1910 in France.

== Incumbents ==
- President: Armand Fallières
- President of the Council of Ministers: Aristide Briand

== Events ==
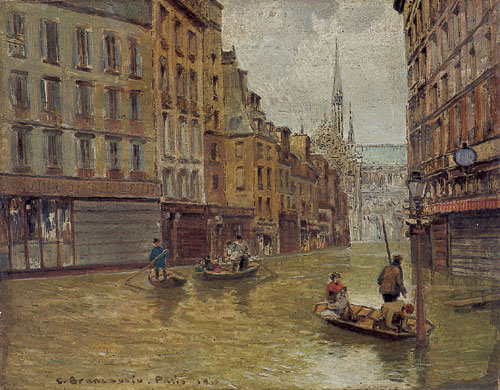
Flood in Paris by Carlo Brancaccio

- 15 January – Constant rain in Paris causes the Seine to overflow its banks, flooding the city. All but one line of the Paris Métro becomes filled with water, effectively draining water from the city.
- 24 April – French legislative election held.
- 8 May – French legislative election held.
- 2 July – Demonstrations against public executions.
- Cigarette brands Gauloises and Gitanes launched.
- Champagne Riots begin.

== Art ==
- Georges Braque
  - Mandora
  - Pitcher and Violin
  - Woman with a Mandolin
- Marcel Duchamp
  - The Bush
  - Portrait de Dr. Dumouchel
- Albert Gleizes
  - L'Arbre
  - La Femme aux Phlox
- Henri Matisse
  - La danse
  - La Musique
  - Still Life with Geraniums
- Jean Metzinger
  - Nu à la cheminée
  - Deux nus
- Pablo Picasso
  - Daniel-Henry Kahnweiler
  - Femme et pot de moutarde
  - Girl with a Mandolin
  - Portrait de Ambroise Vollard
- Pierre-Auguste Renoir
  - After the Bath
  - Nude
- Henri Rousseau - Le Rêve

== Literature ==
- Colette - La Vagabonde
- Gaston Leroux - Le Fantôme de l'Opéra
- Maurice Renard - Le Péril bleu

== Music ==
- Claude Debussy - Préludes, Livre 1
- Paul Dukas - Prélude élégiaque
- Jules Massenet - Don Quichotte
- Gabriel Fauré - La Chanson d'Ève
- Maurice Ravel
  - Ma mère l'Oye
  - Menuet sur le nom d'Haydn
- Camille Saint-Saëns
  - La muse et le poète
  - Ouverture de fête
- Igor Stravinsky - L'Oiseau de feu

== Sport ==
- 3 July – The eighth Tour de France begins.
- 31 July – Tour de France ends, won by Octave Lapize.

== Births ==
=== January to March ===
- 10 January – Jean Martinon, conductor and composer (died 1976)
- 25 January – Henri Louveau, motor racing driver (died 1991)
- 9 February – Jacques Monod, biologist, awarded Nobel Prize in Physiology or Medicine in 1965 (died 1976)
- 13 February – Elsa Barraine, composer (died 1999)
- 14 February – Pierre Marcilhacy, politician (died 1987)
- 19 February – Mathilde Carré, French Resistance agent, became a double agent (died 1970)
- 2 March – Charles Pisot, mathematician (died 1984)

=== April to June ===
- 12 April – Irma Rapuzzi, politician (died 2018)
- 23 April – Simone Simon, actress (died 2005)
- 30 April
  - Pierre Lantier, composer and pianist (died 1998)
  - Georges Rose, footballer (died 1997)
- 4 June – Jacques Berque, Islamic scholar and sociologist (died 1995)
- 6 June – Hélène de Beauvoir, painter (died 2001)
- 8 June – Fernand Fonssagrives, photographer (died 2003)
- 11 June – Jacques Cousteau, naval officer, explorer, ecologist, filmmaker, scientist, photographer and researcher (died 1997)
- 17 June – Raymond Poïvet, cartoonist (died 1999)
- 23 June – Jean Anouilh, dramatist (died 1987)
- 27 June – Pierre Joubert, illustrator (died 2002)

=== July to December ===
- 2 July – Louise Laroche, one of the last remaining survivors of the sinking of the RMS Titanic (died 1998)
- 5 July – Georges Vedel, public law professor (died 2002)
- 6 July – René Le Grevès, cyclist (died 1946)
- 7 July – Raymond Polin, philosopher (died 2001)
- 27 July – Julien Gracq, writer (died 2007)
- 5 August – Bruno Coquatrix, songwriter and music impresario (died 1979)
- 7 August – Lucien Hervé, photographer (died 2007)
- 14 August
  - Willy Ronis, photographer (died 2009)
  - Pierre Schaeffer, composer, originator of musique concrète (died 1995)
- 29 August – Georges Loinger, resistance fighter (died 2018)
- 1 September – Pierre Bézier, engineer (died 1999)
- 2 September - Madeleine Barbulée, actress (died 2001)
- 3 September – Maurice Papon, Vichy government official, prefect of police of Paris (died 2007)
- 8 September – Jean-Louis Barrault, actor, director and mime artist (died 1994)
- 14 September – Gaston Defferre, politician (died 1986)
- 29 September – Paule Maurice, composer (died 1967)
- 8 October – Paulette Dubost, actress (died 2011)
- 27 October – René Zazzo, psychologist (died 1995)
- 29 October – Aurélie Nemours, painter (died 2005)
- 13 November – Jean-Marcel Jeanneney, politician and diplomat (died 2010)
- 19 December – Jean Genet, writer and political activist (died 1986)
- 21 December – Rosa Bouglione, circus performer (died 2018)

=== Full date unknown ===
- Ernestine Chassebœuf, letter writer (died 2005)
- Henri Enjalbert, professor of geography (died 1983)

== Deaths ==
- 4 January – Leon Delagrange, pioneer aviator (born 1873)
- 5 January – Léon Walras, economist (born 1834)
- 26 February – Marie Henri d'Arbois de Jubainville, historian and philologist (born 1827)
- 24 March – Gaston du Bousquet, steam locomotive engineer (born 1839)
- 16 April – Julien Dupré, artist (born 1851)
- 1 May – Louis Welden Hawkings, English painter (born 1849)
- 18 May – Pauline García-Viardot, mezzo-soprano and composer (born 1821)
- 27 June – Gustave Emile Boissonade, legal scholar (born 1825)
- 21 July – Léopold Victor Delisle, bibliophile and historian (born 1826)
- 2 September – Henri Rousseau, painter (born 1844)
- 10 September – Emmanuel Frémiet, sculptor (born 1824)

== See also ==
- List of French films of 1910
