= Fermina Márquez =

- Title page for Fermina Márquez (1911)
- Author: Valery Larbaud
- Language: French
- Publisher: Fasquelle
- Publication date: 1911
- Publication place: France

Fermina Márquez is a short novel in twenty chapters written by French writer Valery Larbaud.

It was considered for the Prix Goncourt in 1911 but did not win. It is one of Larbaud's best known works along with his Diary of A.O. Barnabooth and Enfantines. It is an early example of the novel of adolescence.

== Publishing history ==
The work was first published in serial form in 1910 in the Nouvelle Revue Française. It was first published in book form by Fasquelle in 1911. It has been published in both pocketbook and deluxe bookclub editions. In 1950, it was published in a special edition, by G. Jean-Aubry, as one of the best novels of the first half of the twentieth century, as chosen by jury.

== Plot ==
The story concerns the arrival of a young girl from Colombia at Saint Augustine's, a Roman Catholic school for boys located near Paris, and her effect on the young men there, particularly on a bookish and solitary student, Joanny Léniot. The eponymous Fermina Márquez arrives at the school with her aunt, sister and younger brother, "little Márquez", who was just enrolled there as a student. His family makes an arrangement with the school authorities in which they are allowed to visit him at Saint Augustine's for a time until he becomes adjusted to life at his new school. The students are entranced by Fermina's beauty and proximity, and each begins to fantasise about her and to look for opportunities to seduce her.
