= Le Palais Ducal =

1908 series of paintings by Claude Monet

Claude Monet, Le Palais Ducal, 1908

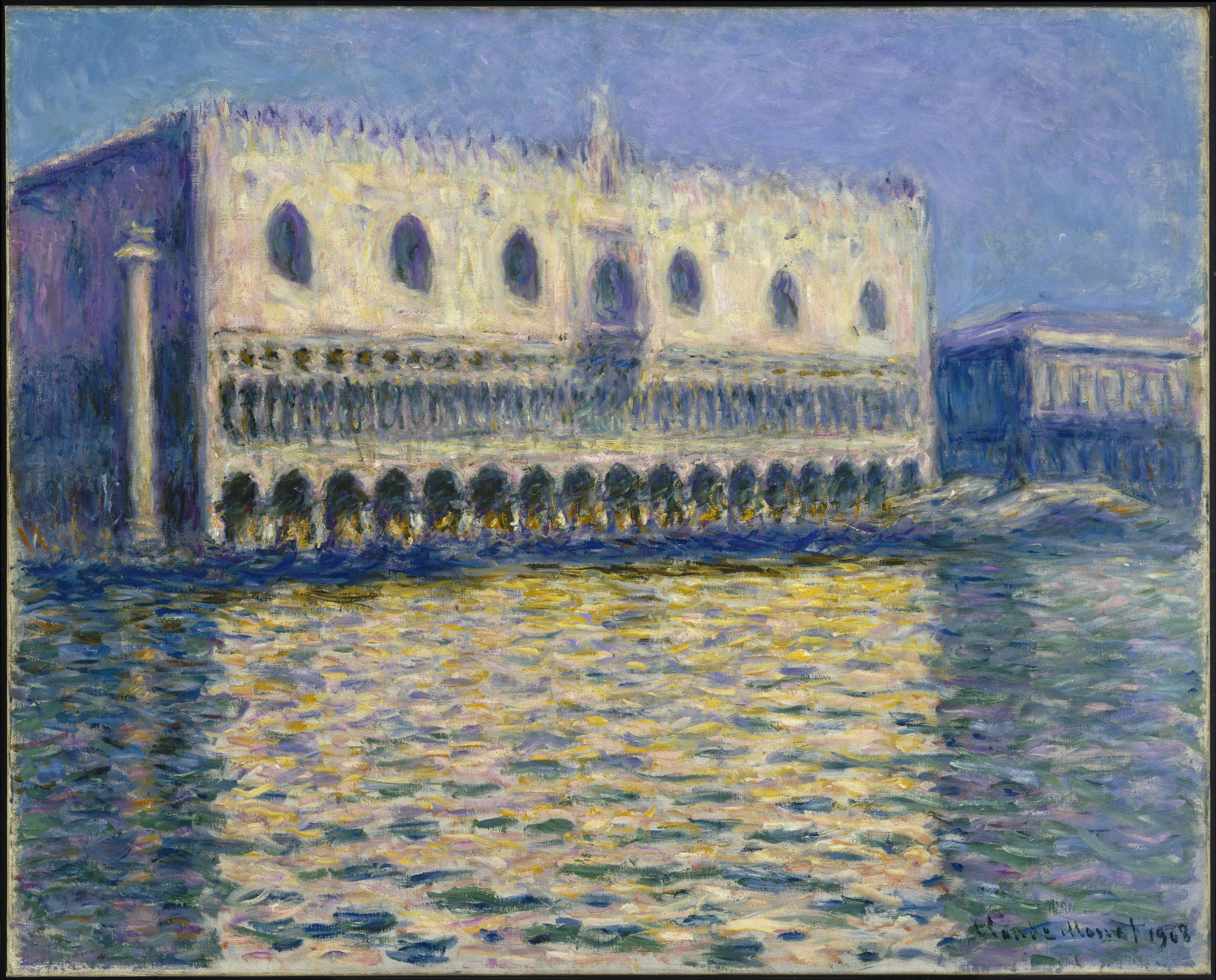
Brooklyn version, W1743

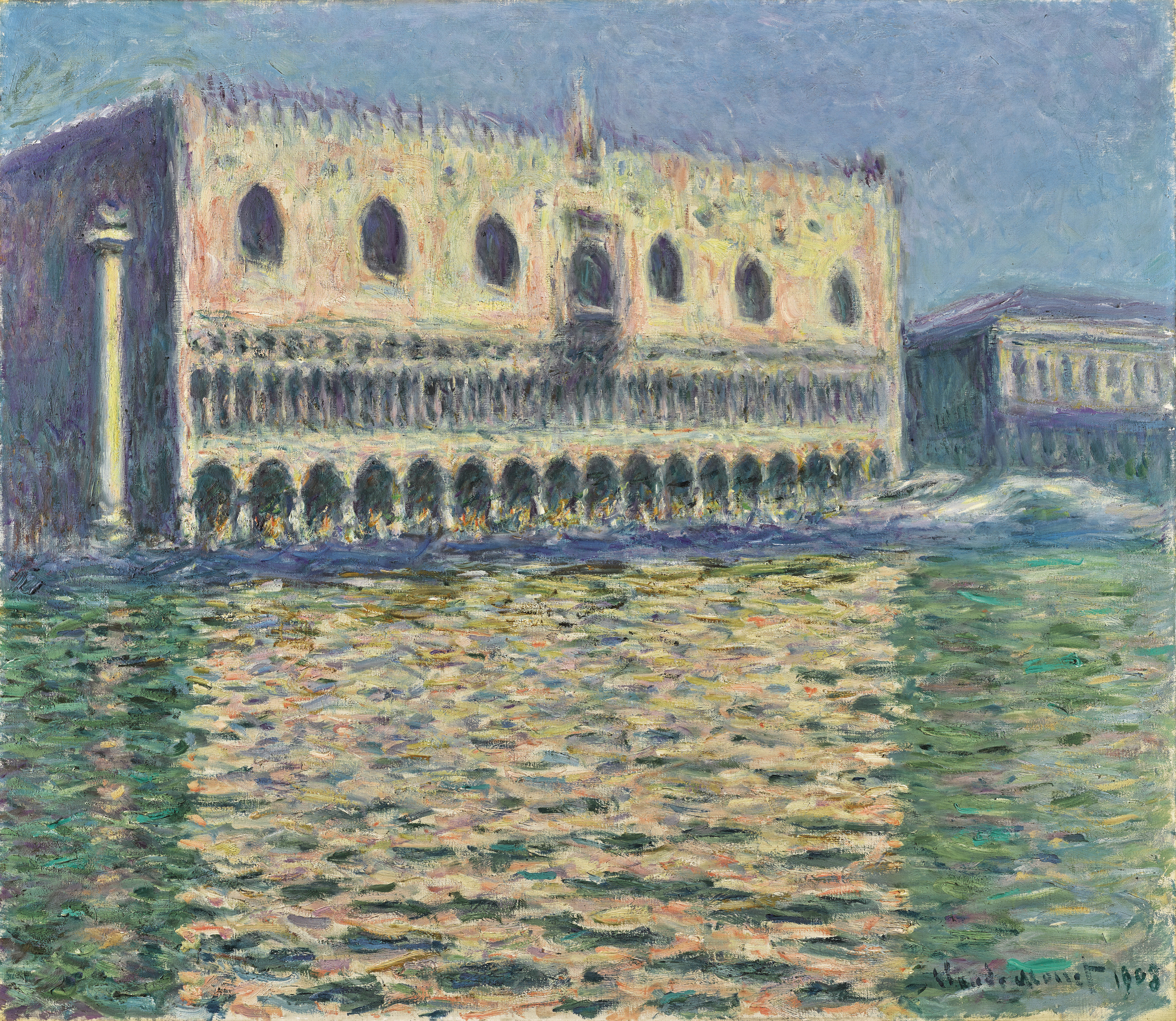
Goeritz version, Sotheby's, W1744

Le Palais Ducal or The Doge's Palace is the name given to various oil paintings which depict the Doge's Palace (in French "Le Palais Ducal", translated to Italian as "Palazzo Ducale") made by Claude Monet during his only visit to Venice, which occurred in 1908.

== Description ==
Monet painted the Doge's Palace from several viewpoints during his three-month sojourn in Venice, from October to December 1908. The title Le Palais Ducal generally refers to three similar paintings dominated by the palace itself, painted from a boat moored in the lagoon: one in the collection of Adele and Herbert J. Klapper in the U.S., a second in the Brooklyn Museum, and a third in a private collection of the Goeritz family in the UK from the 1920s until it was sold at Sotheby's in February 2019. They are catalogued by Wildenstein as W1742 to W1744.

The Impressionist works are painted with dappled brushstrokes in a bright palette of pinks, yellows, and blues, bathed in a warm light. It is roughly divided into two horizontal zones. The upper part depicts the pink and white diamond patterned stonework of the Venetian Gothic palace walls pierced by arched windows with colonnaded arcades on the lower two floors, the blue sky above, the Lion of Venice column in the Piazzetta di San Marco to the left, and Ponte della Paglia and the New Prison (Prigioni Nuove) building to the right. The lower part is filled with the rippling waters of the Venetian lagoon and the reflection of the buildings.

Monet had intended to return to paint in Venice again, but the illness of his second wife Alice Hoschedé prevent him travelling. He continued to work on many of his Venetian paintings when he returned home to Giverny, until they were shown in a critically acclaimed exhibition at Galerie Bernheim-Jeune in May 1912. Paul Signac considered these paintings to be one of Monet's greatest achievements.

== Influence by the Venetian school ==
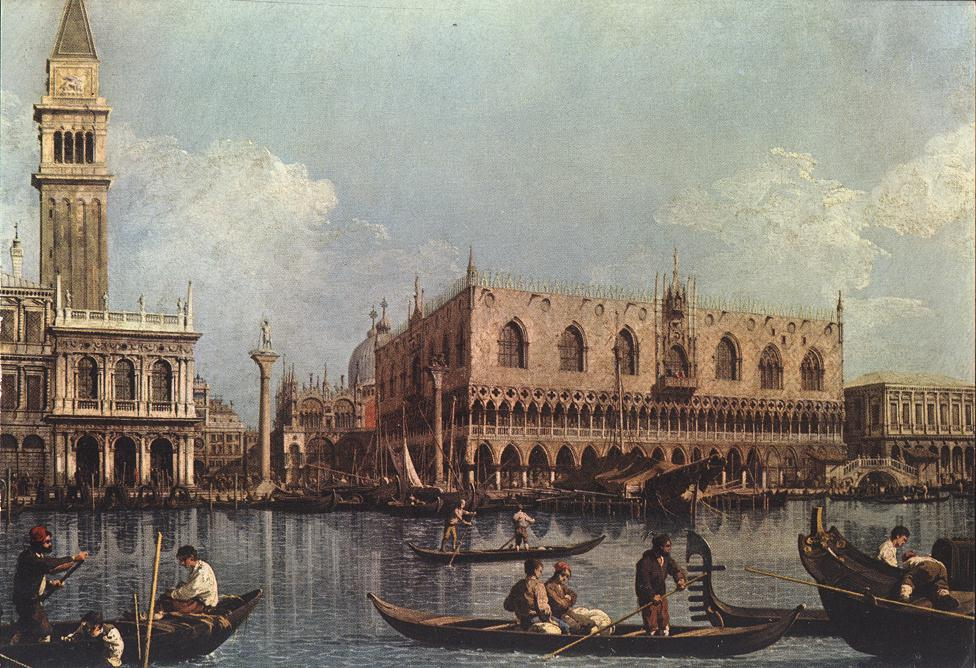
Veduta del bacino di San Marco dalla Punta della Dogana (1740-1745) by Canaletto - Brera

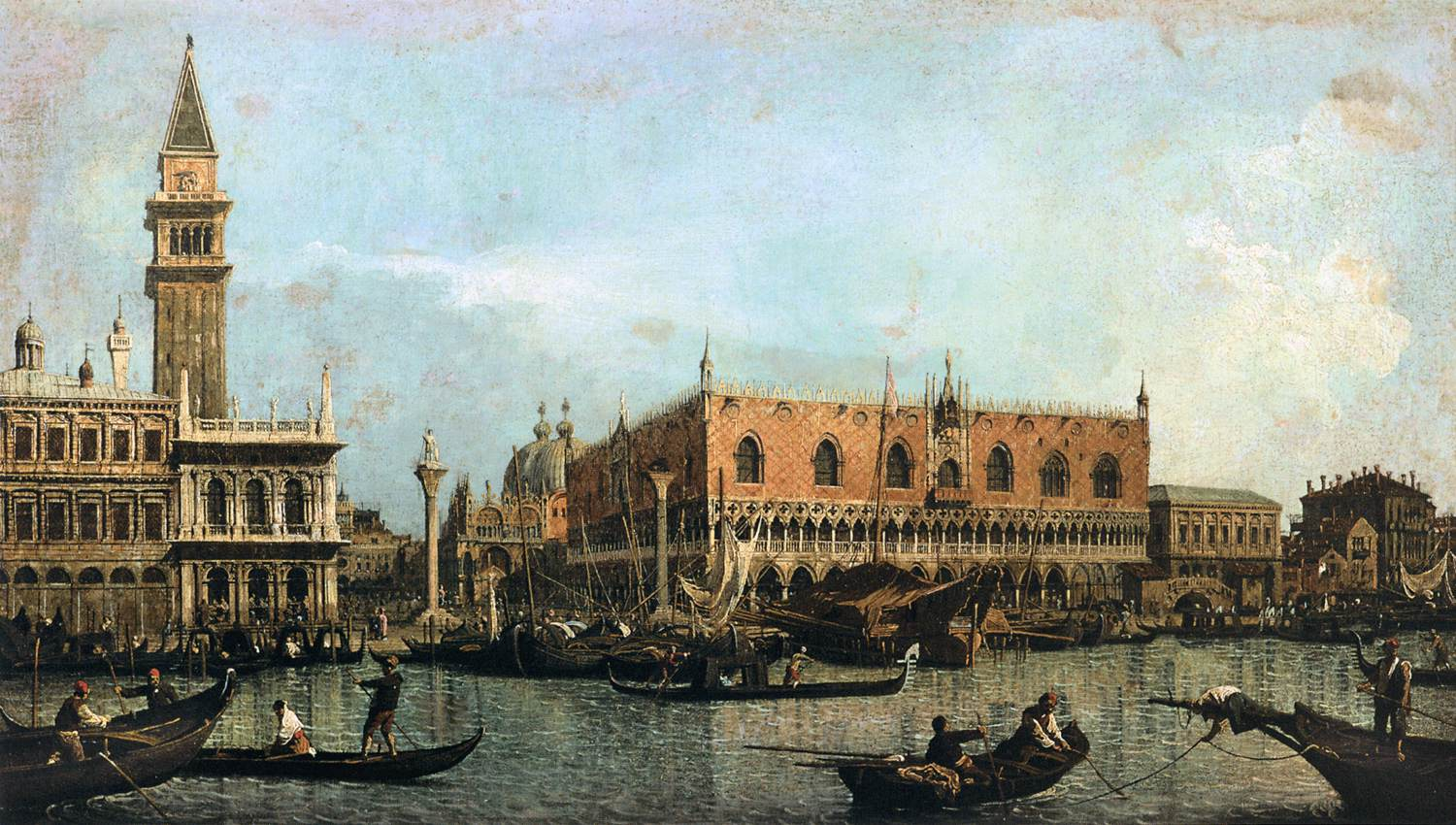
Le Môle, vu du bassin de San Marco (1730-1755) by Giovanni Antonio Canal (il Canaletto) - Louvre

Eighteenth century cityscapes by Venetian artists such as Canaletto's Bacino di San Marco from the Puntana della Dogana painting, now at the Pinacoteca di Brera in Milan, or The Molo, Seen from the Bacino di San Marco, now in the Louvre in Paris, may have been an inspiration to Monet for choosing the framing of his composition.

== Monet's other versions ==
One version of Le Palais Ducal (W1742) was exhibited at the Galerie Bernheim-Jeune in Paris in 1912, and sold via the Galerie Durand-Ruel in 1917 to Pierre Dubeid in Neuchâtel, and then via Galerie Caspari in Munich to Max Emden in Berlin. Emden, a Jewish department store owner, was persecuted by the Nazis in the 1930s, and some of his artworks were sold in unclear circumstances via Swiss dealers. It seems the painting came into the private collection of Hermann Lütjens of Küsnacht near Zürich, and was later acquired by Erich Maria Remarque and held in his collection in Locarno by 1959. It was sold by Remarque's widow Paulette Goddard in New York in 1979, and acquired by a dealer who sold to Adele and Herbert J. Klapper in 1980. The painting measures 73 cm × 92 cm (29 in × 36 in), and is signed and dated "Claude Monet 1908". The Klappers kept it in their private collection until at least 2011. After the deaths of Herbert in 1999 and Adele in 2018, some works from their collection (but excluding this Monet) were auctioned at Christie's in New York in November 2018.

A second version in the Brooklyn Museum (W1743) measures 32 in × 39 in (810 mm × 990 mm). It was auctioned in New York in 1920, along with other works by Monet from the collection of the doctor Arthur Brewster Emmons. It was bought by the American leather dealer and art collector Aaron Augustus Healy and donated to the Brooklyn Museum the same year, the year before his death.

A third version (W1744) was also exhibited at the Galerie Bernheim-Jeune in Paris in 1912. It was consigned to Paul Cassirer in Berlin in 1914, and sold to Hans Wendland in 1918. It was sold via Thannhauser Galleries to the German textile merchant and art collector Erich Goeritz in 1926, and was held mainly in England after he emigrated in the 1930s. It was loaned to Toronto Art Museum from 1946 until 1950, and after the death of Erich Goeritz in 1955 it was inherited by his son Thomas Goeritz. Signed and dated "Claude Monet 1908", it measures 81 cm × 93 cm (32 in × 37 in). This painting was sold by the descendants of the Goeritz family at Sotheby's in London in February 2019 for £27.5m, setting an auction record for one of Monet's Venetian paintings. On the recommendation of the Reviewing Committee on the Export of Works of Art, an export licence has been temporarily withheld by the Department for Digital, Culture, Media and Sport to permit another buyer to match the price, to keep the painting in the UK.

== Similar paintings by Monet ==
Monet painted two other views of the Doge's Palace in 1908. One of these views shows The Doge's Palace Seen from San Giorgio Maggiore — of which six versions are known (W1751 to W1756) —, offering a more distant viewpoint across the Bacino di San Marco canal from the piazza in front of Palladio's abbey church of San Giorgio Maggiore. Another shows a more oblique point of view from further east, one version of which also was owned by Wendland and Erich Goeritz, but sold to Jakob Goldschmidt in about 1928, confiscated by the Nazi regime, and recovered after the Second World War by Erwin Goldschmidt, and sold at Sotheby's in 2015 for US$23m to a private collector. This collector later turned out to be the German billionaire Hasso Plattner, founder of the new Museum Barberini, a reconstructed palace in a neo-baroque style which opened in 2017 in Potsdam, built to house his newly acquired collection of Impressionist and Post-Impressionist French paintings.^{,}

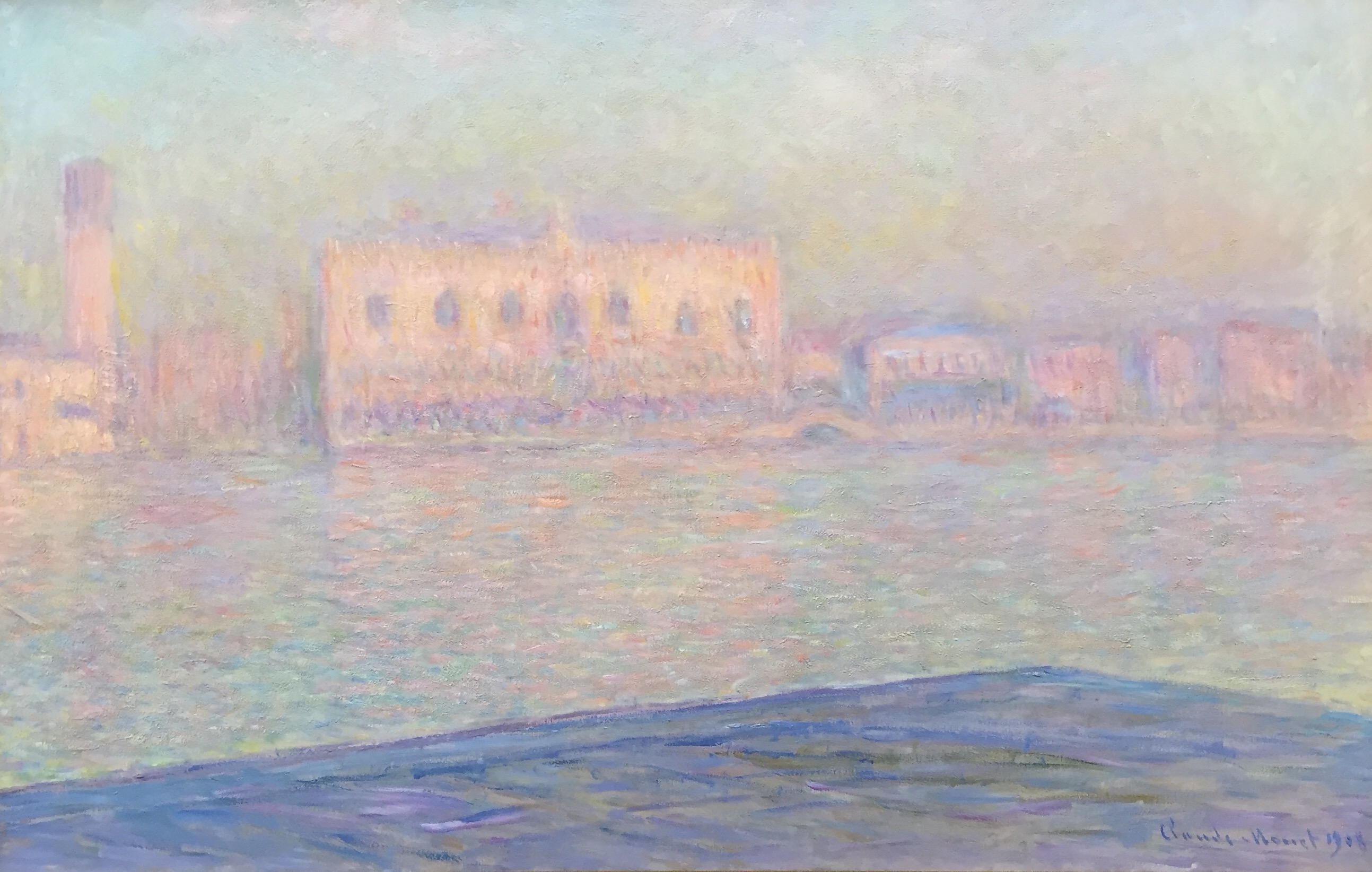
The Doge's Palace Seen from San Giorgio Maggiore (Claude Monet) Kunsthaus Zürich (W1751)

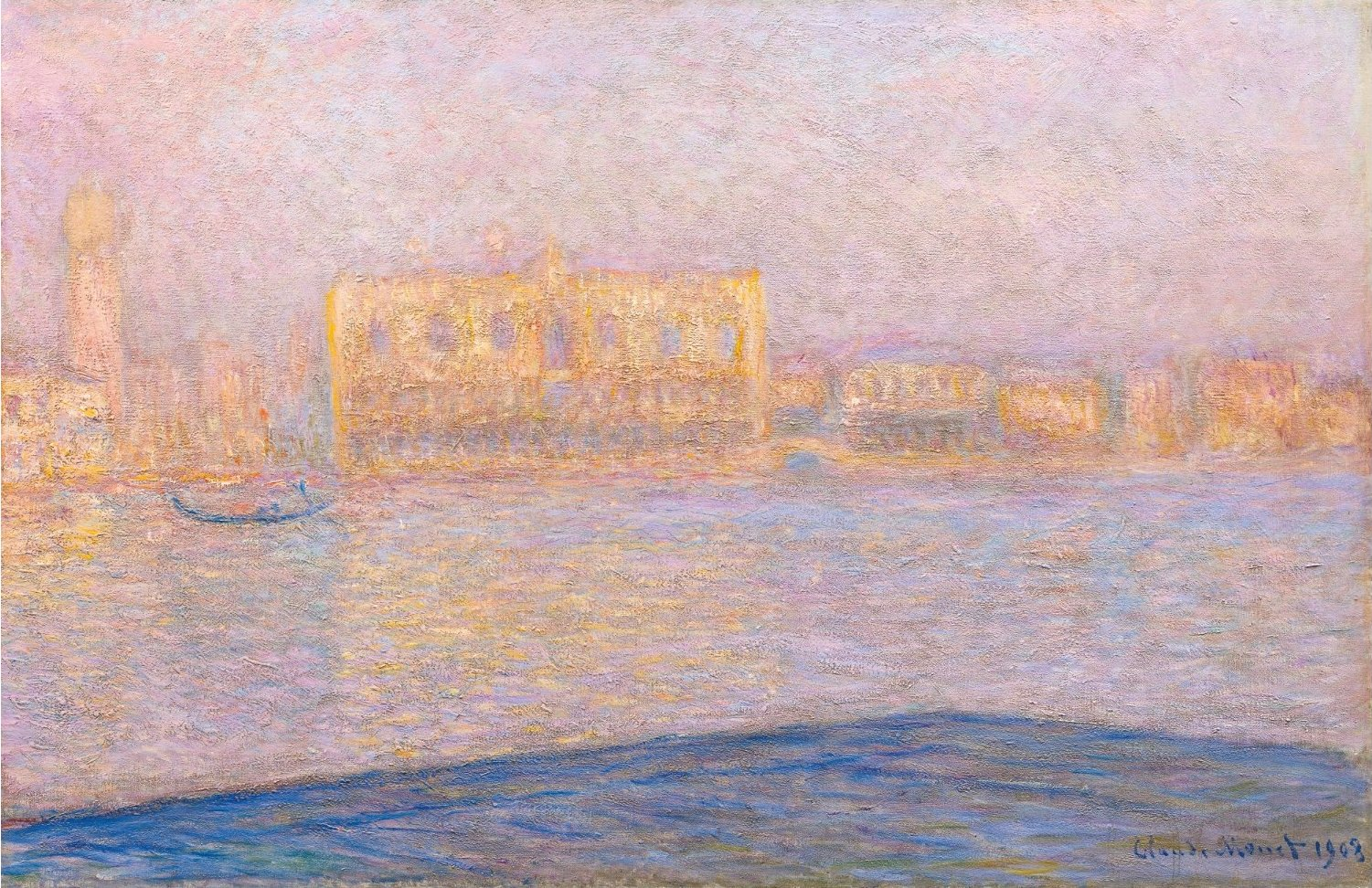
Le Palais Ducal vu de Saint-Georges Majeur, Sotheby's, 2016 (W1752)

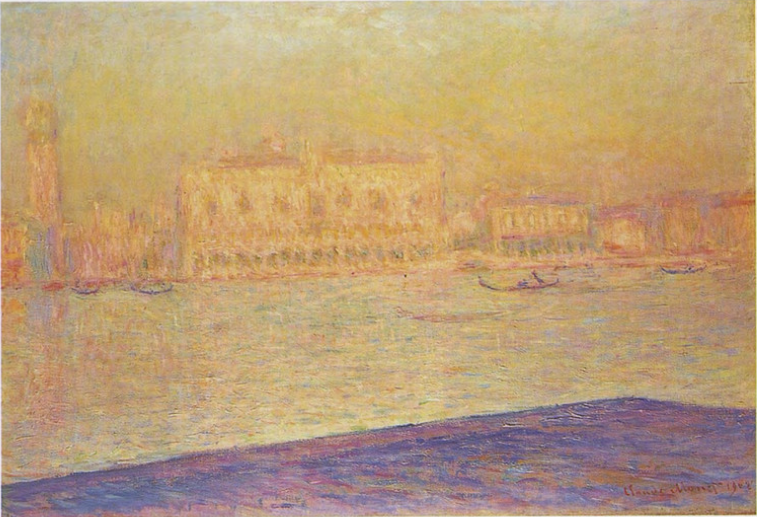
Le Palais ducal vu de Saint-Georges Majeur, private collection (W1753)

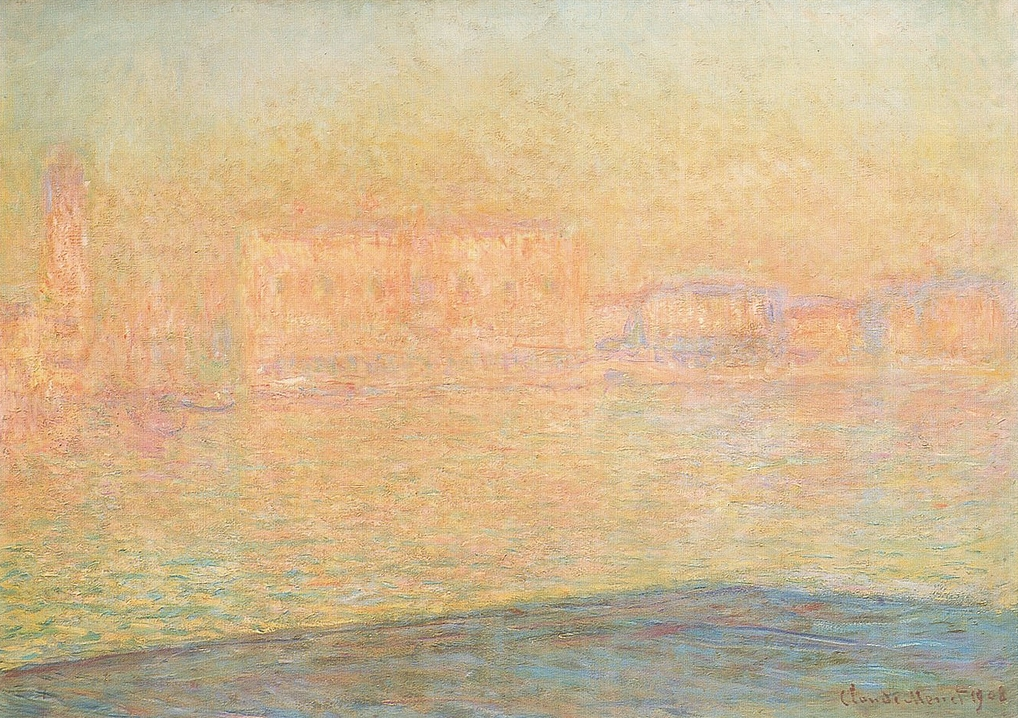
Le Palais ducal vu de Saint-Georges Majeur, private collection, Christie's, 1992 (W1754)

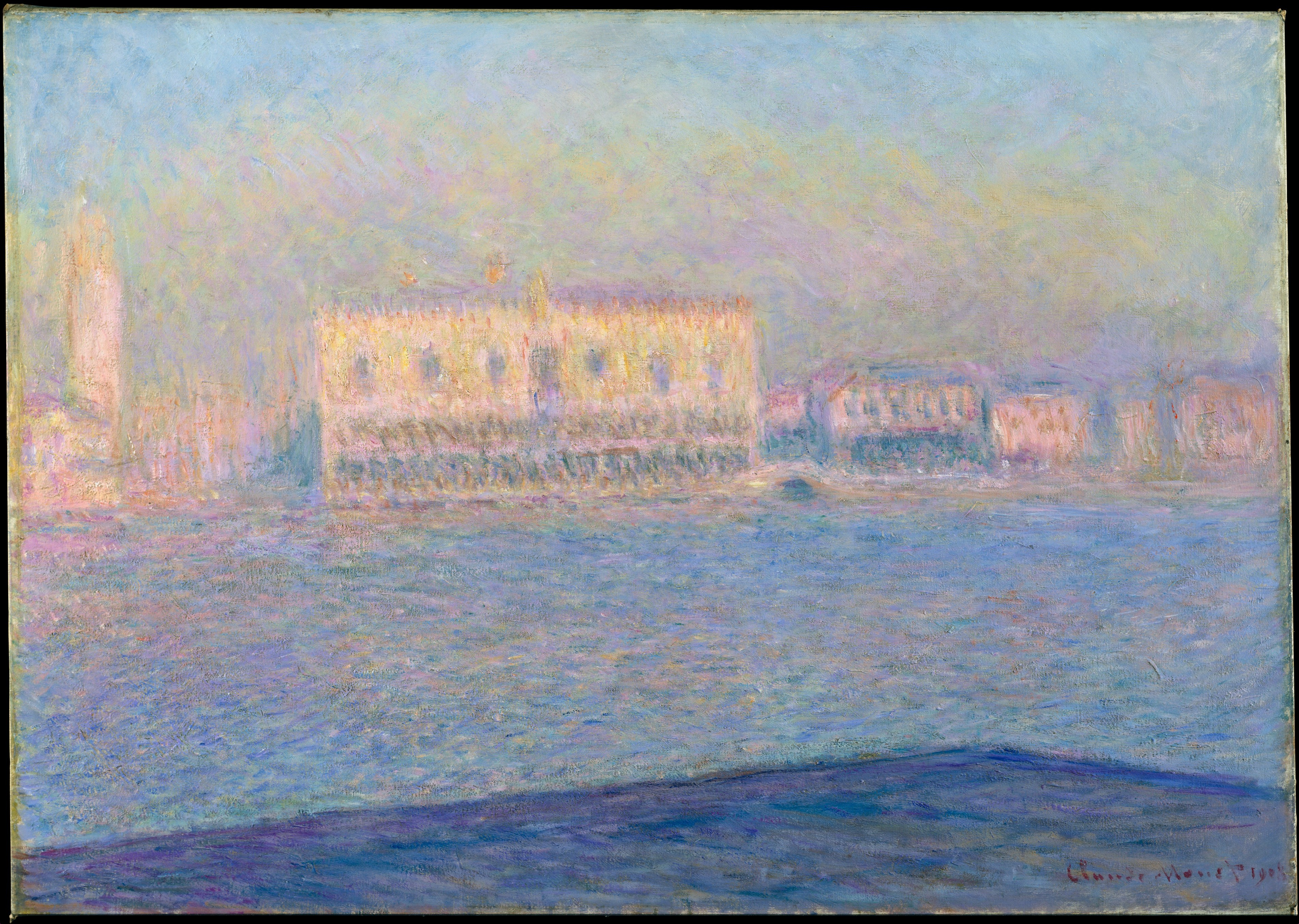
The Doge's Palace Seen from San Giorgio Maggiore (Claude Monet) Metropolitan Museum of Art (W1755)

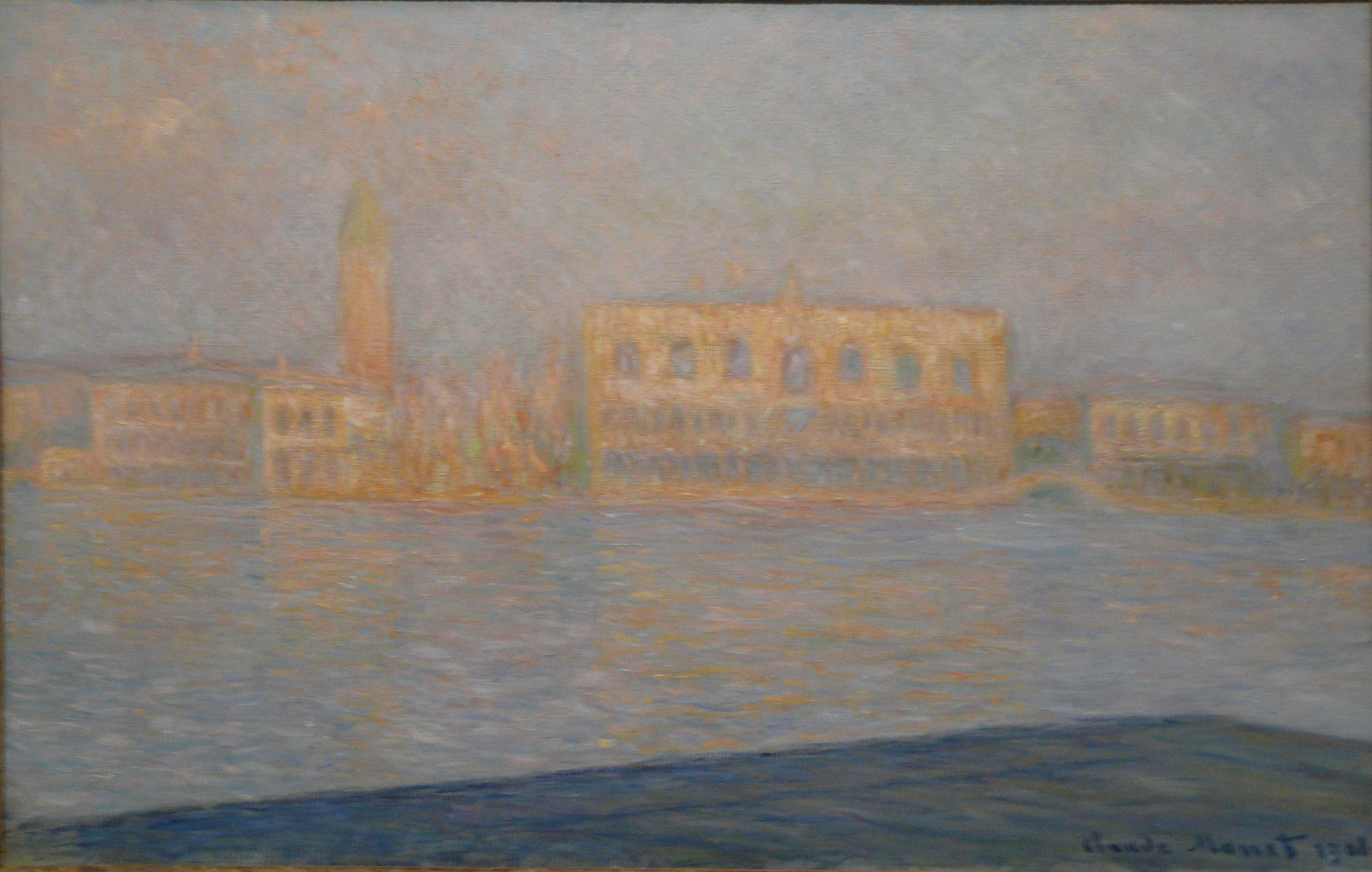
Le Palais ducal vu de Saint-Georges Majeur, Solomon R. Guggenheim Museum (W1756)

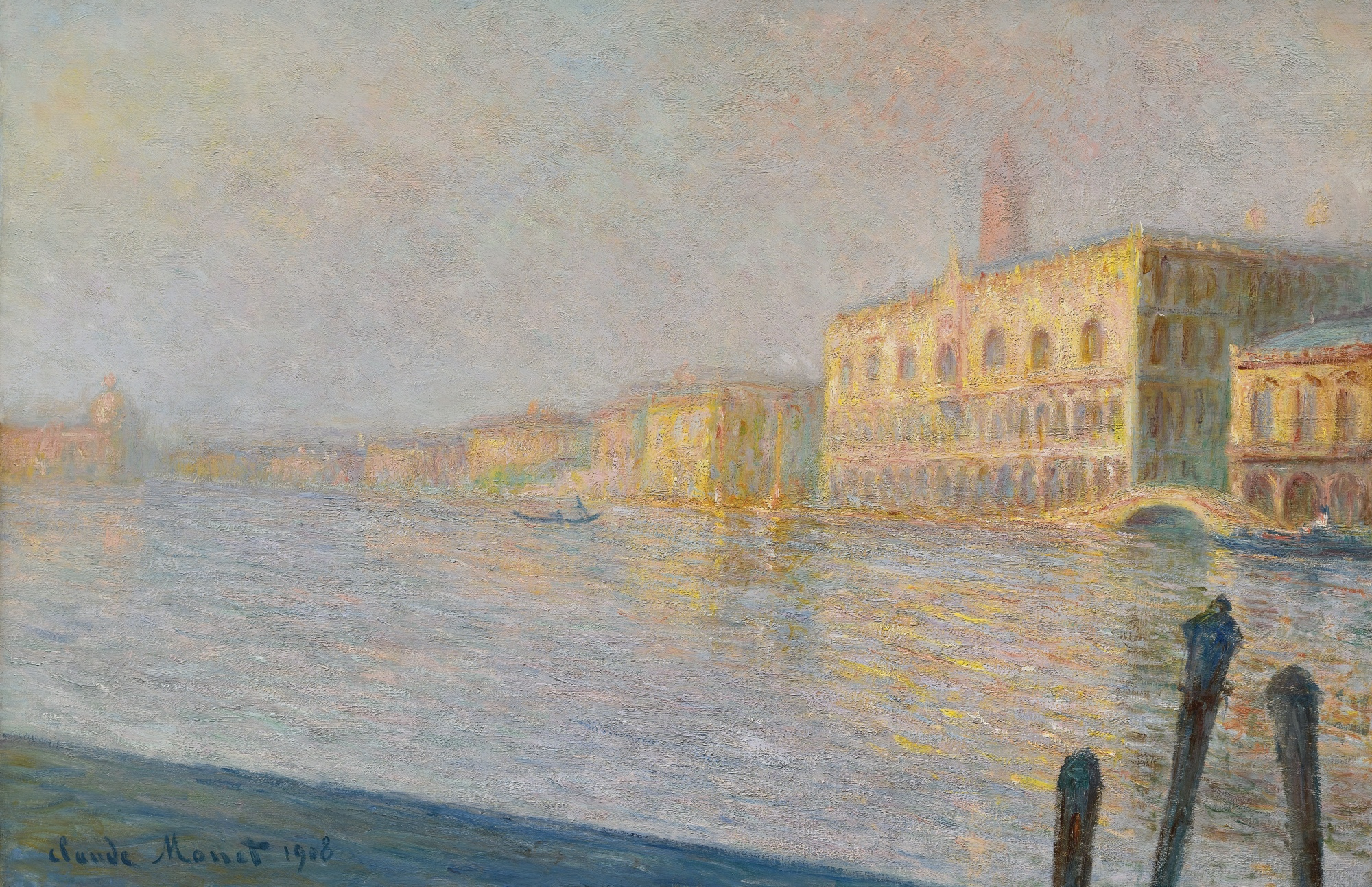
Le Palais Ducal, Hasso Plattner collection, Museum Barberini (W1770)

== See also ==
- List of paintings by Claude Monet
- History of the Doge's Palace in Venice
