= Valery Larbaud =

French writer and poet (1881-1957)

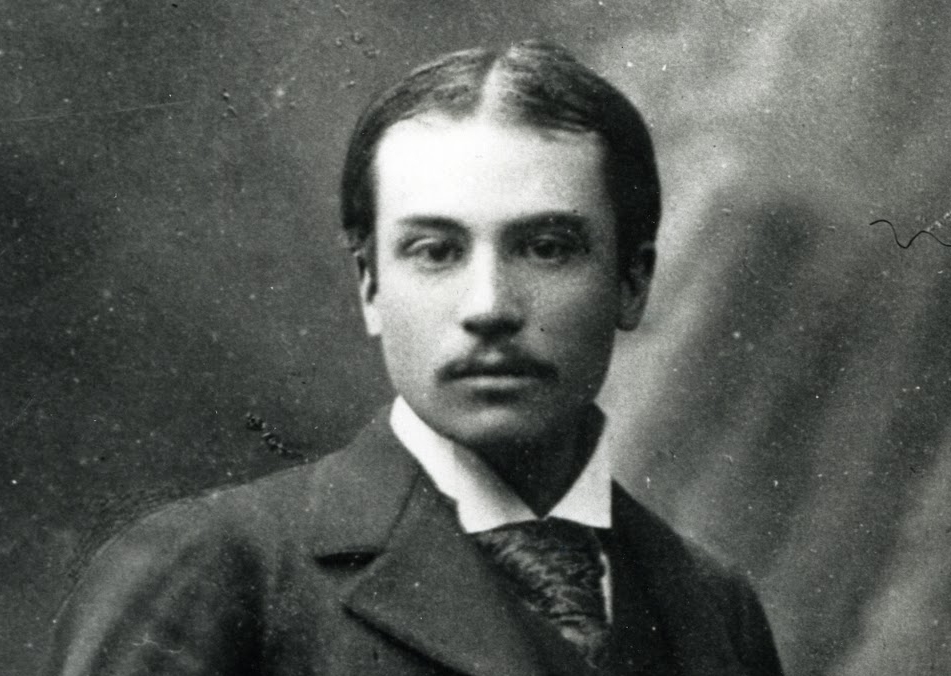
- Portrait of Larbaud, c.1900
- Born: 29 August 1881; Vichy, Allier, French Third Republic
- Died: 2 February 1957 (aged 75); Vichy, Allier, French Fourth Republic
- Education: Lycée Louis-le-Grand
- Occupations: Writer, translator, critic
- Writing career
- Years active: 1908-1935
- Notable work: Fermina Márquez

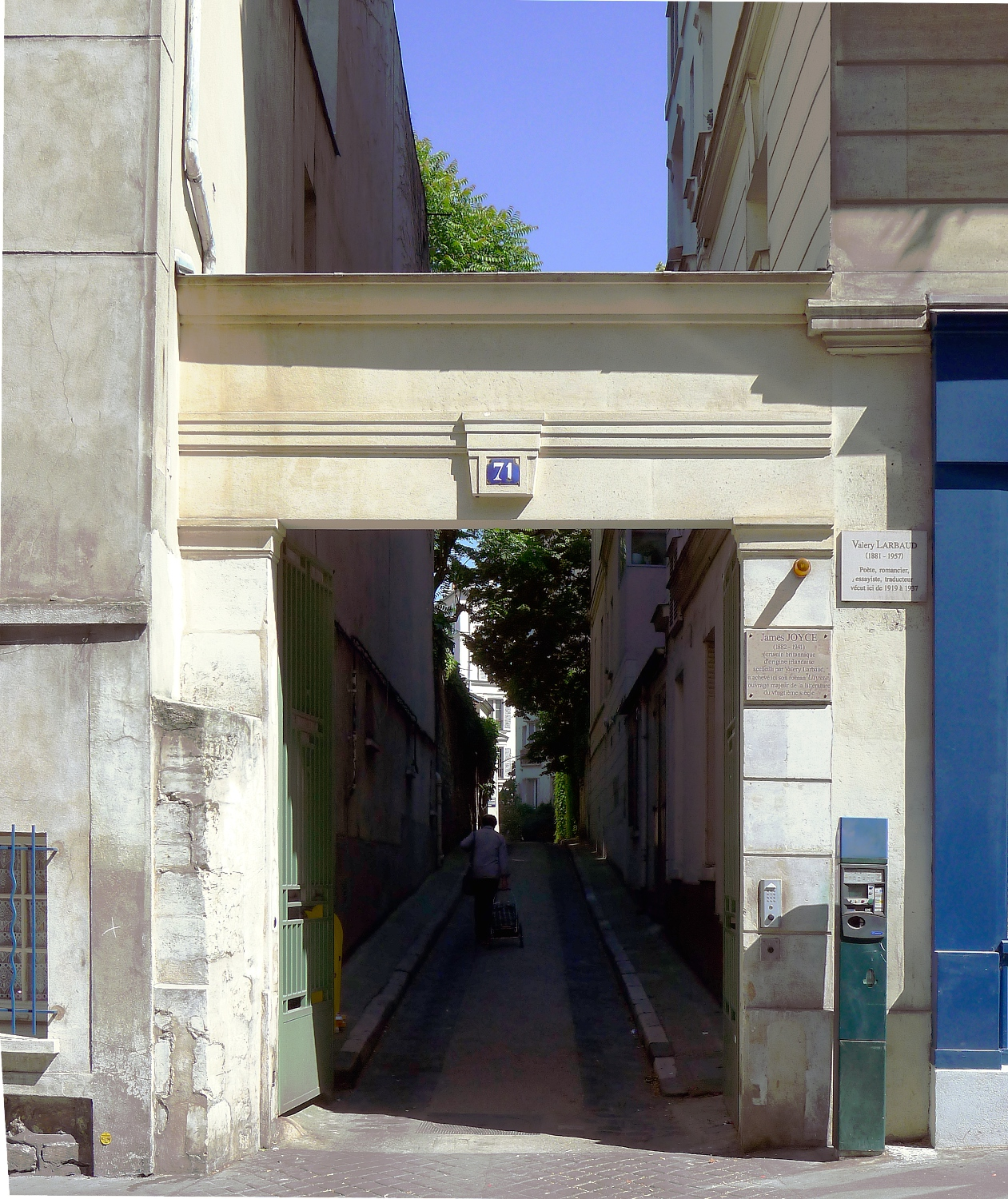
Rue Cardinal-Lemoine n°71, where he lived from 1919 to 1937

Valery Larbaud (29 August 1881 – 2 February 1957) was a French writer and poet.

== Life ==
He was born in Vichy, the only child of a pharmacist Nicolas Larbaud and Isabelle Bureau des Étivaux. His father died when he was 8, and he was brought up by his mother and aunt. His father had been owner of the Vichy Saint-Yorre mineral water springs, and the family fortune assured him an easy life. He travelled Europe in style. On luxury liners and the Orient Express he carried off the dandy role, with spa visits to nurse fragile health.

Poèmes par un riche amateur, published in 1908, received Octave Mirbeau's vote for prix Goncourt. Three years later, his novel Fermina Márquez, inspired by his days as a boarder at Sainte-Barbe-des-Champs at Fontenay-aux-Roses, had some prix Goncourt votes in 1911 but did not win; nonetheless, it is still considered to be a minor classic of French literature and one of Larbaud's best known works.

He spoke six languages including English, Italian and Spanish. In France he helped translate and popularise Samuel Taylor Coleridge, Walt Whitman, Samuel Butler, and James Joyce, whose Ulysses was translated by Auguste Morel (1924–1929) under Larbaud's supervision.

At home in Vichy, he saw as friends Charles-Louis Philippe, André Gide, Léon-Paul Fargue and Jean Aubry, his future biographer. An attack of hemiplegia and aphasia in 1935 left him paralysed. Having spent his fortune, he had to sell his property and 15,000 book library. Despite his illness, he continued to receive many honorary titles, and in 1952 he was awarded the Grand prix national des Lettres.

The prix Valery Larbaud was created in 1967 by L'Association Internationale des Amis de Valery Larbaud, a group founded to promote the author's work. Past winners of this yearly award include J.M.G. Le Clézio, Jacques Réda, Emmanuel Carrère, and Jean Rolin.

== Works ==
- Poèmes par un riche amateur (1908) as A.O. Barnabooth.
- Fermina Márquez (1911)
- A.O. Barnabooth (1913)
- Enfantines (1918)
- Beauté, mon beau souci (1920)
- Amants, heureux amants (1923)
- Mon plus secret conseil... (1923)
- Ce Vice impuni, la lecture : domaine anglais (1925)
- Jaune bleu blanc (1927)
- Aux couleurs de Rome (1938)
- Ce Vice impuni, la lecture : domaine français (1941)
- Sous l'invocation de saint Jérôme (1946)
- Chez Chesterton
- Ode à une blanchisseuse
