= List of French films of 1910 =

This is a list of films produced in France in 1910.

Title	Director	Cast	Genre	Notes
1812				
L'Absente				
Académicien et vagabond				
Acte de probité				
Affaire d'honneur				
L'Agence Alice ou La sécurité des ménages				
L'Aigle des roches				
Aimez-vous les uns les autres				
Ajaccio, the Birthplace of Napoleon				
L'Alibi				
An Alpine Retreat				
L'Aluminite				
L'Ambition d'Agénor le Chauve				
Amitié de cow-boy				
Amour de page				
L'Amour du ranch				
Amour et fromage				
L'Amour et le temps				
L'Amour guette				
L'An 100				
Apparitions fantômatiques				
Après la chute de l'Aigle				
L'Argentier de Louis XI				
Athalie				
L'Attaque d'un train				
Au bord de la faute				
Au temps des grisettes				
Au temps des pharaons				
Au temps des premiers chrétiens				
L'Auberge rouge				
Aunt Julia's Portrait				
L'Autre mère				
L'Autre				
L'Avare				
Les Aventures d'un cow-boy à Paris				
Les Aventuriers du Val d'Or				
L'Aventurière				
L'Enseveli de Tebesa (The Buried Man of Tebessa)	George Hatot		Short	
Dans les ruines de Carthage (Through the Ruins of Carthage)				
Max fait du ski				
Entre le devoir et l'honneur (Between Duty and Honor)				
Une évasion manquée				
Une séance de cinématographe				
Le Prisonnier du Château d'If				

== See also ==
- 1910 in France
