= Seated Nude (Matisse) =

Painting by Henri Matisse

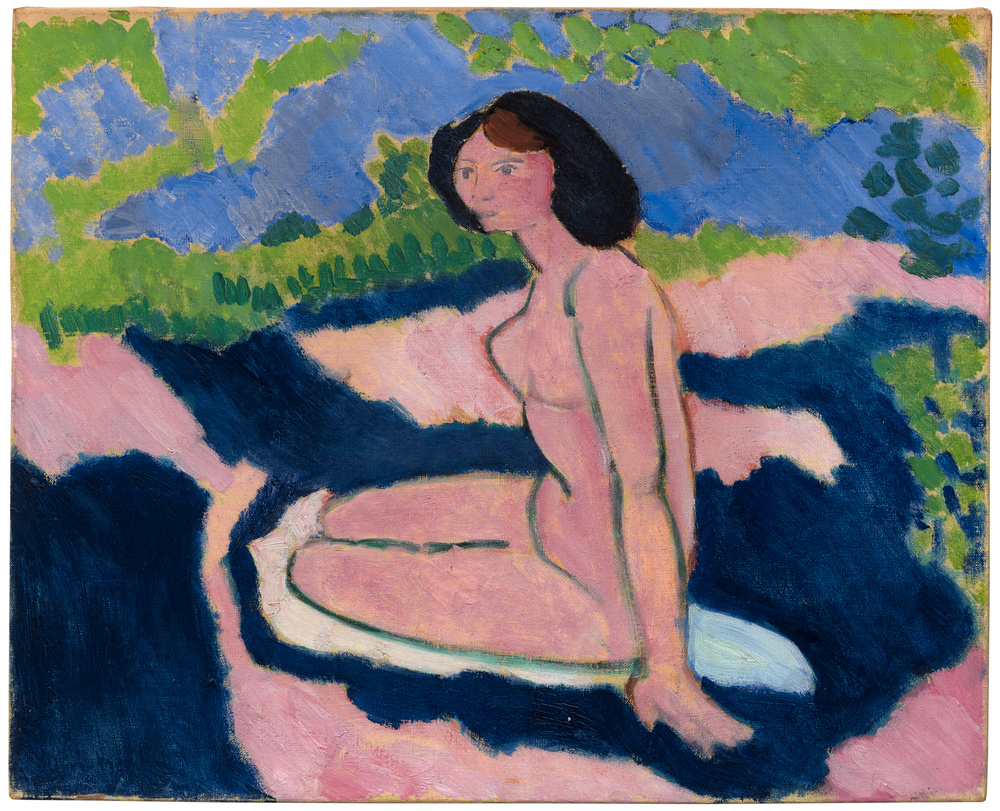

Seated Nude (French - Nu assis) or Pink Nude (Nu rose) is a 1909 oil on canvas painting by Henri Matisse. It is now in the Museum of Grenoble, to which it was left in the 1923 Agutte-Sembat legacy.

== See also ==
- List of works by Henri Matisse
