= The Banks of the Bièvre near Bicêtre =

Painting by Henri Rousseau

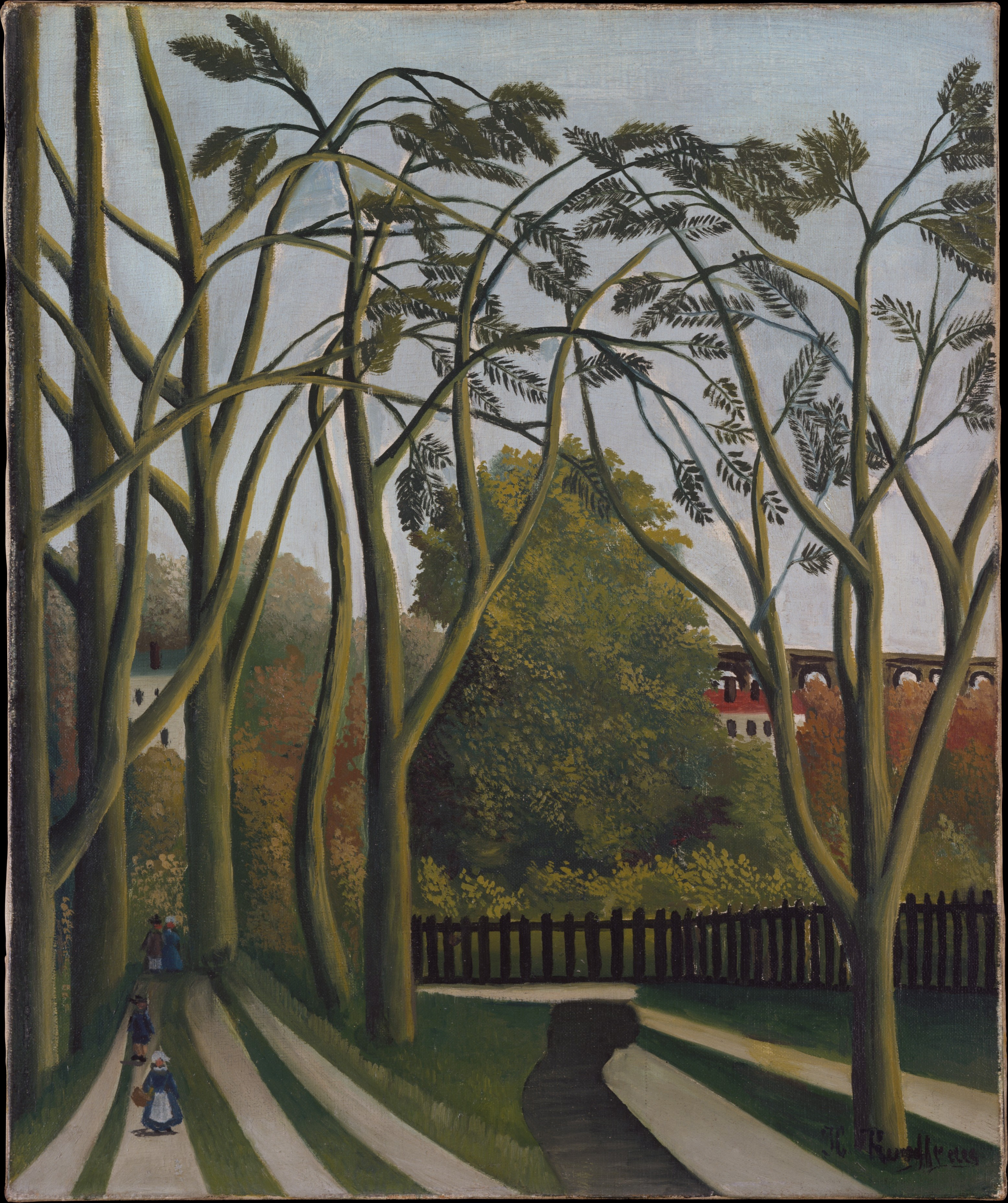
- Artist: Henri Rousseau
- Year: c. 1908–09
- Medium: Oil on canvas
- Dimensions: 54.6 cm × 45.7 cm (21.5 in × 18.0 in)
- Location: Metropolitan Museum of Art; New York

The Banks of the Bièvre near Bicêtre is an oil-on-canvas painting executed c. 1908–09 by French artist Henri Rousseau. It depicts the working-class community of Bicêtre on the outskirts of southern Paris. The painting is in the collection of the Metropolitan Museum of Art, in New York.
