= Isabelle (novella) =

1911 novella by André Gide

- Second edition cover (1911)
- Author: André Gide
- Translator: Walter Ballenberger
- Language: French
- Genre: Récit
- Set in: Calvados department, 1890s
- Publisher: Les Éditions de la Nouvelle Revue Française
- Publication date: 1911
- Pages: 194
- Dewey Decimal: 843.912

Isabelle is a novella (described as a récit) by André Gide, published in 1911.

== Plot ==
25-year-old Gérard Lacase from the Sorbonne studies for his doctorate on Jacques-Bénigne Bossuet at the remote castle of Quartfourche in northern Normandy. He falls in love with a portrait of Isabelle, the daughter of the family who owns the castle.
