= Pitcher and Violin =

Painting by Georges Braque

- Artist: Georges Braque
- Year: 1909–1910
- Medium: Oil on canvas
- Dimensions: 116.8 cm × 73.2 cm (46.0 in × 28.8 in)
- Location: Kunstmuseum, Basel

Violin and Pitcher is an oil on canvas painting by French painter Georges Braque, from 1910. It is an early and pivotal example of analytical cubism. Art historian William Rubin said, "Only with the stunning and magisterial Violin and Pitcher...does Braque's work fully match its inventiveness" while also for the first time equaling the "weight and density" with that of Picasso, Braque's cubism co-inventor. It is held in the Kunstmuseum, in Basel.

== History ==
Violin and Pitcher was part of a series of still lives that Braque painted in 1910–1912; and is typical of Braque and Picasso's close joint project of analytical cubism during 1910–1912.

== Description and analysis ==
Braque's work plays and comments on illusionism: it shows an interior with a violin and a pitcher, but differing from traditional still lives, it is a simulacrum of bas relief, and like many bas relief sculptures, it is presented in monochrome tonalities for its faceted and overlapping forms in a compressed space. An incidental allusion to trompe l'oeil, to further play with the two-dimensionality of space, is a nail from which the canvas seems to hang. In this painting Braque presents a main idea of analytical cubism, in which "under the analytical gaze of a cubist, an object is divided into many separate geometric elements, angles, faces, which are then arranged in a certain way on the plane of the canvas, forming semi-abstract ... compositions".

References to trompe-l'oeil were characteristic of when cubists strived to depict reality more in its entirety; from divergent angles and points of view, actualizing every moment of the object's being. The objects in the paintings are deprived of material foundations, giving way to geometric forms, and the paintings themselves tend to resemble abstract schemes. The illusiveness, monochrome and deliberate "flatness" of the objects takes them out of the traditional context and forces viewers to rethink them in new categories.to further play with the two-dimensionality of space
