= Anna Caspari =

German art dealer

- Born: 16 May 1900; Breslau, German Empire
- Died: 25 November 1941 (aged 41); Kaunas, German-occupied Lithuania
- Occupation: art dealer
- Known for: Holocaust victim, restitution

Anna Caspari (16 May 1900 – 25 November 1941) was a German Jewish art dealer who was deported from Germany and murdered by the Nazis in Kaunas in 1941.

== Early life ==
Daughter of Hugo Naphtali of Breslau and Olga Naphtali (née Bielski), Anna Caspari studied art history in Munich and married the art dealer Georg Caspari.

== Galerie Caspari ==
On 20 June 1913, Georg Caspari opened a commercial art gallery in the Palais Eichthal on Brienner Straße 52 across from the Café Luitpold. He dealt in old masters and modern art, antiquities and drawings.

Artworks included works by Rottenhammer and Maulbertsch old masters, 19th century works by Feuerbach, Böcklin, Leibl and Thoma as well as more modern works by Max Liebermann, Wilhelm Trübner, Max Slevogt, Edouard Manet, Pierre-Auguste Renoir and Vincent van Gogh. Artists ranges from locals like Maria Caspar-Filser and Oskar Coester to international stars like Paul Klee, Kokoschka, Lehmbruck, and Pablo Picasso. In the evening there were public readings by Wedekind, Heinrich Mann, Thomas Mann, Werfel.

In 1930, Georg Caspari was killed in a car accident. Widowed, Anna had to look after the children Ernst (* 1926) and Paul (* 1922) alone. In 1935 the gallery was relocated to 6 Ottostraße.

== Nazi looting and deportation ==
On 19 January 1939, the Gestapo went to the "widowed Jewess" to "seize cultural property" under the guise of protecting it. Caspari's residence at the Hotel Continental and art warehouse on Briennerstraße 52 were ransacked and the Nazis looted 22 paintings, 140 books and numerous prints and drawings. The stolen art was then given as a "gift" to the Bavarian National Museum, the State Library and the State Graphic Collection .

Before she was deported by the Nazis and murdered, Caspari managed to get her sons to safety in London. From 1938, she desperately tried to join her two sons, however her requests for permission to emigrate were repeatedly rejected by the German authorities.

On 20 November 1941, Anna Caspari was deported to Wehrmacht-occupied Lithuania during the first episodes of mass deportations of Jewish citizens from Munich. She was murdered on 25 November in Kaunas. Her mother Olga Naphtali was deported to Theresienstadt.

== Restitution claims ==
Many of Galerie Caspari's clients were Jewish, and like all Jews in Germany they were persecuted, their property Aryanized and their belongings including art collections were plundered during the Nazi era. As a result, in addition to claims filed by Caspari's family, Caspari's clients have filed restitution claims for art looted or sold under duress in Nazi Germany. One of the most famous cases involves the collection of Max Emden.

== Bibliography ==
- Stadtarchiv München, Biographisches Gedenkbuch der Münchner Juden, 1933–1945
- Münchener Neue Secession, Graphische Ausstellung 1918, Frühjahr 1918, München 1918 Digitalisat
- Stephan Kellner, Forschung nach NS-Raubgut an der Bayerischen Staatsbibliothek, Ein Zwischenbericht, München 2008
- Alexandra Lautenbacher, Raub jüdischer Kunstsammlungen – onesprime.de
- Horst Keßler/Vanessa Voigt, Die Beschlagnahmung jüdischer Kunstsammlungen 1938/39 in München. In: Regine Dehmel (Hrsg.), NS-Raubgut in Museen, Bibliotheken und Archiven, Frankfurt am Main 2012, S. 119–132.
- Lynn Rother: Kunst durch Kredit : Die Berliner Museen und ihre Erwerbungen von der Dresdner Bank 1935. Berlin : De Gruyter, 2017
