= Fishing Boats =

Painting by Georges Braque

- Year: 1909
- Medium: oil paint, canvas
- Dimensions: 92.1 cm (36.3 in) × 73.3 cm (28.9 in)
- Location: Audrey Jones Beck Building
- Collection: Museum of Fine Arts, Houston
- Accession no.: 74.135

Fishing Boats or The Port is a painting by the French artist Georges Braque, created in 1909 in Paris. It is in the collection of the Museum of Fine Arts, Houston, in the John A. and Audrey Jones Beck Collection. It was purchased at auction in 1968, and donated to the museum in 1974.

This oil on canvas is a cubist landscape representing a port in Normandy, fishing boats in the foreground.
