= László Beszédes =

Hungarian sculptor

László Beszédes (1874–1922) was a Hungarian sculptor, noted for his small bronze and terracotta statuettes, and his speciality of creating figurines of farmers.

Beszédes was born in Feled in 1874. He attended the School of Industrial Design. He later worked in Vienna and visited Munich and Paris.

He was employed by the French Institute of Cartography, for many years during which he journeyed extensively through the French colonies in Africa and Asia.

In 1908 he sculpted Joseph (Slave) a 48 cm bronze statuette. It is currently housed in the Hungarian National Gallery in Budapest.

He later lived in Budapest until his death in 1922.
