= Auguste Houzeau =

French agronomist and chemist (1829–1911)

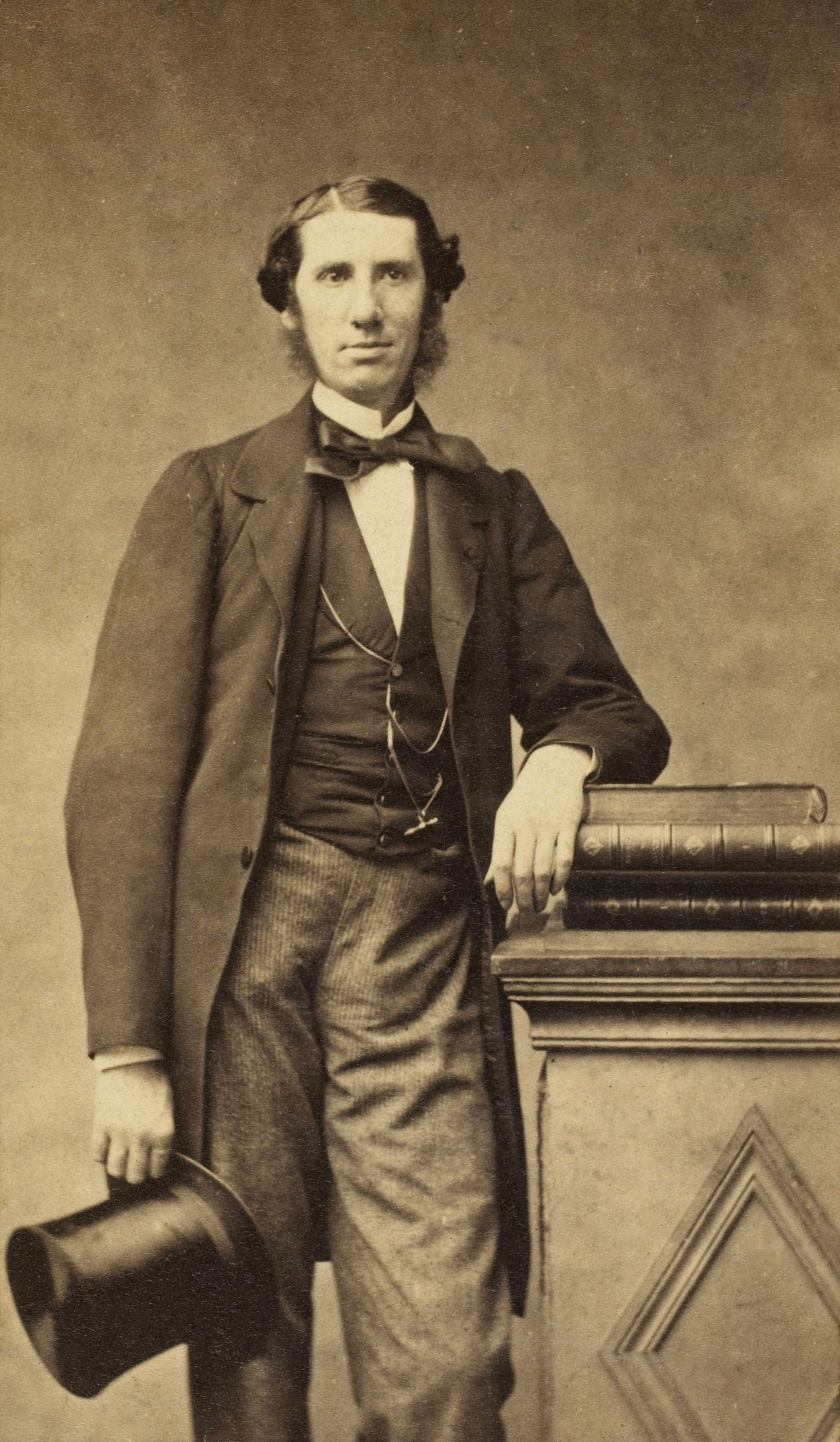
Photograph by Pierre Petit (1860)

Auguste Houzeau (French: [ogyst uzo]; 3 March 1829, Elbeuf – 17 February 1911, Rouen) was a French agronomist and chemist.

He studied at the Conservatoire national des arts et métiers in Paris, where he took chemistry classes from Jean-Baptiste Boussingault. He later served as a professor at the École préparatoire à l'enseignement supérieur des sciences et des lettres in Rouen, and in 1883 was appointed director of the Station agronomique de la Seine-Inférieure. He was also president of the Société centrale d'agriculture de la Seine-Maritime.

He is remembered for his investigations on the nature of ozone and its diffusion into the atmosphere; as well as for various studies of fertilizers and for his research involving apple pomace. He was the recipient of several awards during his career, such as:

- (1862): The Médaille de vermeil from the Société industrielle d'Elbeuf.
- (1870): Chevalier of the Légion d'honneur, being promoted to officer in 1895.
- (1872): The Médaille d'or of the Sociétés savantes à la Sorbonne.
- (1872): Platinum medal from the Société d'encouragement of Paris.
- (1877): The Prix Jecker for his work associated with ozone.
- The Ordre du Lion et du Soleil of Persia.

== Published works ==
- Histoire de la houille et de ses dérivés, 1863 – History of coal and its derivatives.
- Organisation de la station agronomique de Rouen, 1863 – Organization of the agronomic station at Rouen.
- Sur la génération naturelle et artificielle de l'ozone, 1874 – On the natural and artificial generation of ozone.
- Instruction sur l’emploi de l’azotimètre pour le tirage des engrais azotés, 1874 – Instruction on the use of an azotimeter with nitrogen fertilizers.
- Détermination de la valeur des engrais, 1875 – Determining the value of fertilizer.
- Le Marc de pommes, sa composition, son emploi, sa conservation, 1887 – Apple pomace, composition, usage, conservation.
- Sur la composition de quelques fumiers, et sur un moyen simple d’apprécier dans la pratique agricole la composition des fumiers ainsi que leur valeur relative en argent, 1888 – On the composition of various manures, etc.
- Station agronomique de la Seine-Inférieure. Fruits à pressoir et marcs de pommes et de poires, leur emploi dans la ferme : rations nouvelles pour suppléer au manque de fourrage, 1893.
