= Pharmaceutical Hallucinations =

1908 short film by Georges Méliès

- Directed by: Georges Méliès
- Production company: Star Film Company
- Release date: 1908
- Country: France
- Language: Silent

Pharmaceutical Hallucinations (French: Hallucinations pharmaceutiques ou le Truc du potard) is a 1908 French short silent film by Georges Méliès. It was sold by Méliès's Star Film Company and is numbered 1416–1428 in its catalogues.

The giant snail prop in the film had been previously used in Méliès's 1906 fantasy The Chimney Sweep. The film's special effects are worked using stage machinery, pyrotechnics, substitution splices, and multiple exposures.
