= Fasquelle =

Fasquelle is a French surname. Notable people with the surname include:

- Daniel Fasquelle (born 1963), French politician
- Jean-Claude Fasquelle (1930–2021), French publisher
- Solange Fasquelle (1933–2016), French writer
