= Erich Goeritz =

German-British art collector

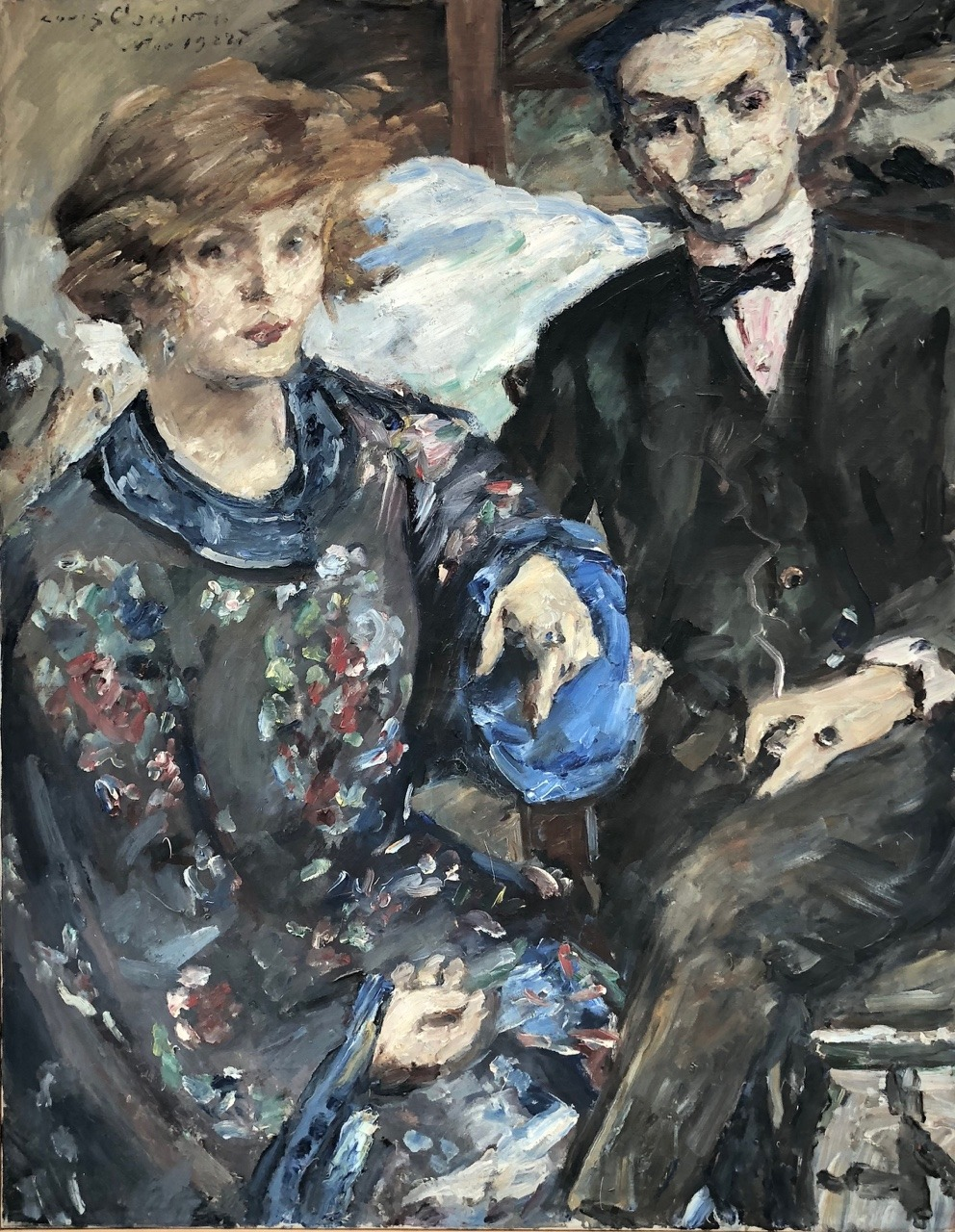
- Erich Goeritz and his wife (1922), portrait by Lovis Corinth
- Born: Erich Joseph Goeritz; February 21, 1889; Chemnitz, German Empire
- Died: 1955; London, United Kingdom
- Occupations: Textile industrialist, art collector, patron of the arts
- Known for: Patronage of Lovis Corinth and modern art collecting

Erich Joseph Goeritz (21 February 1889 – 1955) was a German-British textile industrialist, art collector and patron of the arts.

== Life ==
Erich Goeritz was born in 1889 in Chemnitz as the son of Sigmund and Telma Goeritz; his brother Karl was born in 1900, and the family belonged to the city's Jewish community, where Erich co-founded a Zionist youth group. His father headed the textile firm Gebrüder Goeritz (from 1925 Sigmund Goeritz AG), which initially produced stockings and cloth gloves in Chemnitz, adding knitwear in 1899 and becoming, after expansion of the factory complex, one of the market leaders in high-quality decorative and upholstery fabrics from 1925 onwards.

After commercial training at a company in Breslau, Erich joined the family business in 1914, took over management when his father retired in 1916, and in 1918 married Senta Steinberger from Munich; their son Thomas was born the same year and their son Andreas in 1920. Following Sigmund Goeritz's death, the family moved to Berlin in 1921, turning the Chemnitz works into a branch plant and, in 1925, acquiring the Norddeutsche Trikotweberei in Lübben as an additional production site.

Erich and Senta Goeritz had a strong private interest in music and painting, and part of their art collection was photographed by Waldemar Titzenthaler for an illustrated feature in the magazine Die Dame in 1923 showing their Berlin apartment on Klopstockstraße with several works by Lovis Corinth. Goeritz became one of Corinth's most important patrons and close friends, owning paintings such as Balcony Scene in Bordighera (Museum Folkwang, Essen), Basket of Flowers with Amaryllis, Lilac, Roses and Tulips (private collection), Self-Portrait at Lake Walchensee (private collection), Portrait of the Violinist Andreas Weißgerber (Kunstforum Ostdeutsche Galerie, Regensburg), and Nana, Female Nude (Saint Louis Art Museum), as well as commissioning the double portrait The Art Lovers (Kunstforum Ostdeutsche Galerie, Regensburg) in 1921 and the Portrait of Mr and Mrs Goeritz (private collection) in 1922, and assembling a large holding of Corinth prints.

Goeritz also maintained friendly relations with Max Liebermann, who painted the Portrait of Senta Goeritz (Tel Aviv Museum of Art), and the sculptor Edwin Scharff created a bronze bust of Goeritz that was shown in a 1928 exhibition at the Kronprinzenpalais in Berlin. The historian Michael Brenner counts Goeritz among the most important art collectors of the Weimar Republic, noting that his collection included works by Oskar Kokoschka, Ernst Barlach, Erich Heckel, Karl Schmidt-Rottluff, Conrad Felixmüller, Alexander Archipenko and Jakob Steinhardt, as well as French Impressionist and Post‑Impressionist paintings by artists such as Édouard Manet, Claude Monet and Paul Cézanne.

Repeatedly, Goeritz appeared as a generous patron: in 1922 he donated Corinth's Portrait of his Son Thomas to the Kunstsammlungen Chemnitz, a work removed from the museum as so‑called “degenerate art” in 1937 and now in the collection of the Nationalgalerie in Berlin. In 1925 he gave the Kunstsammlungen Chemnitz around 1,000 lithographs by Honoré Daumier, and after the Nazi seizure of power in 1933, foreseeing the danger for his family and property, he transferred part of his collection in September 1933 to the newly founded Tel Aviv Museum of Art, including sculptures by Renée Sintenis, Ernst Barlach and Wilhelm Lehmbruck, paintings by Max Liebermann and Jakob Steinhardt, a bronze by Edgar Degas, prints by Lovis Corinth and thirty works by Alexander Archipenko.

In 1934 Erich Goeritz emigrated with his wife and two sons via Luxembourg to the United Kingdom, settled in London and continued to work in the textile industry there before later acquiring British citizenship. In 1936 he donated Corinth's painting Temptation of Saint Anthony to the Tate Gallery, and in 1942 he gave the British Museum seven portfolios of Corinth prints and two Bauhaus portfolios with lithographs by Oskar Kokoschka illustrating Johann Sebastian Bach's cantata O Ewigkeit, du Donnerwort, BWV 60.

While Erich Goeritz and his immediate family survived the Second World War, his brother and the latter's children died in 1939 in the sinking of the Dutch ship Simon Bolivar off the English coast. Even after the war he continued occasionally to acquire artworks, for example purchasing Lovis Corinth's Hymn to Michelangelo from Charlotte Berend-Corinth in New York in the early 1950s, now on loan to the Städtische Galerie im Lenbachhaus, Munich; he died in London in 1955.
