= Fun With the Bridal Party =

- Directed by: Georges Méliès
- Production company: Star Film Company
- Release date: September 1908
- Running time: 513 feet (approx. 8 minutes)
- Country: France
- Language: Silent

Fun with the Bridal Party (French: Le Mariage de Thomas Poirot) is a 1908 French silent comedy film directed by Georges Méliès.

== Plot ==
Two pranksters, finding out that a couple is about to apply for a marriage license at the town mayor's office, sneak into the office to pull a practical joke. First they rig up the furniture with string; then they hide in the room, inside some big boxes they put in place of the mayor's desk. When the bridal party arrives for the license, the pranksters go to work, making the chairs and "desk" move of their own accord, foiling the bride's and groom's attempts to sit and the mayor's attempts to write. Finally, the pranksters appear, disguised under white sheets as ghosts. The bridal party rushes in surprise out of the office as the joke comes to a successful close.

== Themes ==
Fun with the Bridal Party was an early example of a silent comedy in which a wedding event was spectacularly disrupted; comedies with similar themes flourished in the 1910s and 1920s, such as A Quiet Little Wedding (1913), On Her Wedding Day (1913), A Muddy Romance (1913), Hushing the Scandal (1915), The Fatal Note (1915), Roaring Lions and Wedding Bells (1917), Shot in the Getaway (1920), and Cutie (1928).

== Release ==
Fun with the Bridal Party was released by Méliès's Star Film Company and is numbered 1294–1300 in its catalogues. It was registered for American copyright on 10 September 1908.

The film is currently presumed lost.
