= Marcel Béalu =

Writer and bookseller

- Born: 30 October 1908; Selles-sur-Cher, France
- Died: 19 June 1993 (aged 84)

Signature
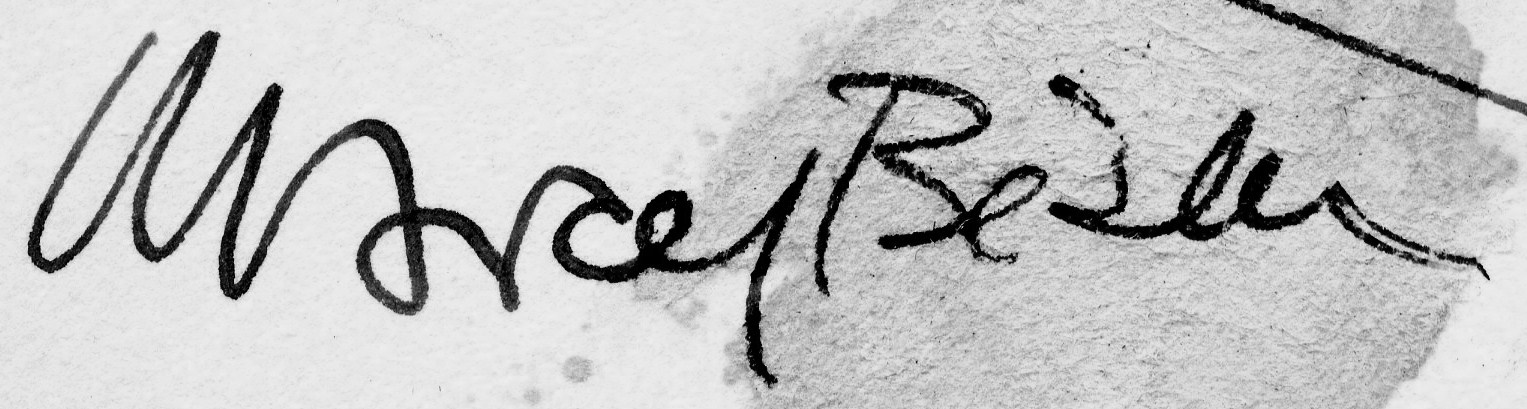

Marcel Béalu (30 October 1908 – 19 June 1993) was a writer and bookseller born in Selles-sur-Cher in the Loire Valley. He died in Paris in 1993.

== Life ==
Béalu was raised in impoverished circumstances in the town of Saumur, not far from his birthplace. Largely self-taught, he read the classics of French literature on his own initiative while working as a haberdasher in Montargis, a town on the canal that links the Loire and the Seine. His wife, Marguerite Kessel, encouraged him to read German literature as well. The grim and cerebral atmosphere of German Romantic literature would make itself felt in his style.

In 1937, Béalu met the poet Max Jacob, who gave him critical encouragement and advice.

In 1951, Béalu set himself up in business as a Parisian bookseller. He named his store Le Pont Traversé ("The Crossed Bridge"), after a comment on his work by Jean Paulhan. The store, which sold all manner of strange works in addition to the more familiar bookshop fare, moved several times, at one time into a former butcher's shop at 62 rue de Vaugirard in Paris. One of his first customers was pre-eminent French psychoanalyst, Jacques Lacan, who purchased a complete edition of Shakespeare — for which he never paid.

Marcel Béalu is most consistently associated with the literature of the fantastic, and in particular with the characteristically French strain of imaginative writing. He was intrigued by the equivocal relationship of fantasy or dream to reality, the uncertainty of reality as a distinct property or mode of being, and his fiction was widely hailed for its dreamlike qualities. While his work was fantastic, it did not reflect a reductive Freudian idea of fantasy as a mere substitute for the banal. His predilection for cramped, seedy, confusing and confining spaces, and for irregularities and repetitions in time, prompted some readers to compare his work with Kafka's.

In 1955, he and Rene Rougerie founded the journal Réalités secrètes, which endured until 1963. Julien Gracq, Jean Paulhan, A. Pieyre de Mandiargues, Charles Nodier, J.M.A. Paroutaud, and Jacques Sternberg were among the authors to appear in the first issue alone. Béalu did not publish a great deal of his own material in the magazine, in part because he chose to be a marginal, remote figure. And he painted, his visual work being another translation of the unreal as was his poetry and fiction.

Marcel Béalu's work has appeared in la Nouvelle Revue Francaise, l’Herne, Poésie 44, La Tour de Feu, Les Lettres, Fiction, La Tour Saint-Jacques, Botteghe Oscure, Dire, Marginales, Les Cahiers du Sud, Betelgeuse.

His writing was admired by Jean Paulhan and Antonin Artaud, but as yet his literary reputation has not fully developed.

== Bibliography ==
=== Prose ===
- Mémoires de l'ombre : fragments (Debresse, 1941).
- Mémoires de l'ombre (Gallimard, 1944; Le Terrain vague, 1959).
- L'Expérience de la Nuit (Gallimard, 1945). The Experience of the Night, trans. Christine Donougher (Dedalus, 1997).
- Journal d’un mort (Gallimard, 1947).
- La Millanderie (Deux Rives, 1949).
- La Pérégrination fantasque (Vrille, 1951).
- L'Araignée d'eau (Librairie Les Lettres, 1948). The Water Spider, trans. Michael Bullock (in Prism International, vol. 15(2/3), 1976; Oasis Books, 1979).
  - L'Araignée d'eau et autres récits fantastiques (1964).
- L'Aventure impersonnelle (Arcanes, 1954). The Impersonal Adventure, trans. George MacLennan (Wakefield Press, 2022).
  - L'Aventure impersonnelle et autres contes fantastiques (1966).
- Contes du demi-sommeil (Fanlac, 1960).
- Passage de la bête (Belfond, 1969).
- La Grande Marée (Belfond, 1973)
- La Poudre des songes (Belfond, 1977).
- Contes du demi-sommeil (Éditions Phébus, 1979).
- La Mort à Benidorm (Fanlac, 1985).
- Le Bruit du moulin (J. Corti, 1986).
- Le Vif : notes et réflexions (Calligrammes, 1987).
- L'Amateur de devinettes (Éditions de la Différence, 1992).

==== Compilations in English ====
- Subterranean Traveller, trans. Michael Bullock (Oasis Books, 1983).

=== Poetry ===
- L'Air de vie : Poèmes 1936–1956 (Seghers, 1958).
- Poèmes 1 : 1936–1960 (Le Pont Traversé, 1976).
- Poèmes 2 : 1960–1980 (Le Pont Traversé, 1981).
- Erréros, suivi de La Rivière (Fata Morgana, 1983).
- Paix du regard sans désir (José Corti, 1988).

=== Plays ===
- La Dernière scène (Rougerie, 1960).
- L’Homme abîmé (Rougerie, 1967).
- La Femme en Cage, ou, Le Triomphe de l'Amour (Rougerie, 1969).

=== Essays and correspondence ===
- Dernier visage de Max Jacob (P. Fanlac, 1946).
- Le Bien rêver (Robert Morel, 1968).
- Anthologie de la poésie française depuis le surréalisme (Éditions de Beaune, 1952).
- Anthologie de la poésie féminine française de 1900 à nos jours (Stock, 1953).
- La Poésie érotique en France (Seghers, 1971).
- Correspondance René Guy-Cadou – Marcel Béalu, 1941-1951 (Rougerie, 1979).
- Le Chapeau magique, autobiography in 3 volumes:
  - Enfances et apprentissage (Belfond, 1980).
  - Porte ouverte sur la rue (Belfond, 1981).
  - Présent définitif (Belfond, 1983).

=== Dedicated journals and edited volumes ===
- Marcel Béalu, ed. Jean-Jacques Kihm (Seghers, 1965). No. 133 in the Poètes d'aujourd'hui series.
- Noah, number 5 (1980).
- Les 100 plus belles pages de Marcel Béalu, ed. Roland Busselen (Belfond, 1984).
- Luc Vidal, Entretiens avec Marcel Béalu, Nantes (Signes, 1985).
- Poésie 87, number 18 (1987).
- Béalu à Nîmes, Bibliothèque Municipale de Nîmes (1988).

== Adaptations ==
A film adaptation of L’Araignée d’eau was produced in 1968 by Jean-Daniel Verhaeghe, as interpreted by Elisabeth Wiener, Dutheil Marie-Angel and Marc Eyraud.

Short animated film by Lys Flowerday after a text by Marcel Béalu. Narration by the author. "Petite Jeune Fille dans Paris" / A Slip of a Girl in Paris ( Contes du demi-sommeil, Editions Phebus ). 10 min. 35 mm colour, . Production La Fabrique, Arte, CNC and DRAC Languedoc Roussillon 1993 Grand Prix — Festival National du Film d’Animation Marly Le Roi 1994 Special Design Prize — Zagreb Animation Festival 1994 Second Animation Prize — Dresden Short Film Festival 1995 Visible at The Forum des Images, Paris, in the Collection Paris.

A radio adaptation of Le Bruit du Moulin was broadcast in 1966, with Edith Scob and Jean Topart.
