= Portrait of Arthur Balfour =

Painting by John Singer Sargent

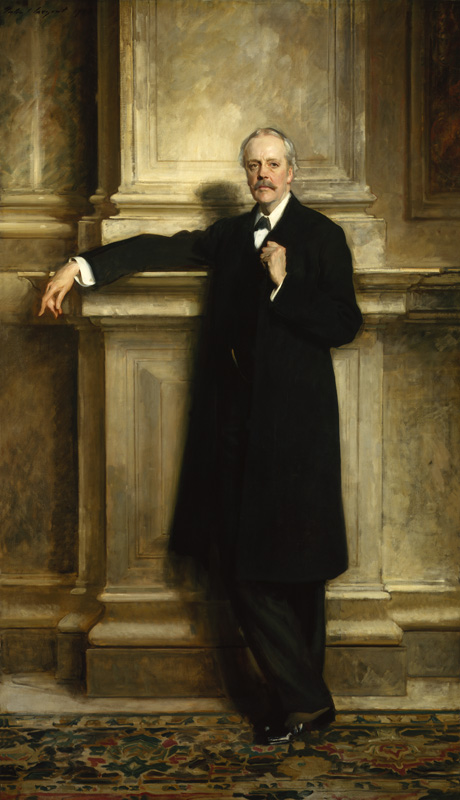
- Artist: John Singer Sargent
- Year: 1908
- Type: Oil on canvas, portrait
- Dimensions: 260 cm × 150 cm (100 in × 59 in)
- Location: National Portrait Gallery, London

Portrait of Arthur Balfour is a 1908 portrait painting by the American artist John Singer Sargent of the British politician and former prime minister Arthur Balfour.

Balfour has succeeded his uncle Lord Salisbury as premier, his close connection to him earlier reportedly giving rise to the phrase "Bob's your uncle". He held the post for three years between 1902 and 1905. He was Leader of the Opposition when he sat for the portrait. He later went on to serve as Foreign Secretary in the coalition government during the First World War when he issued the Balfour Declaration.

The work was commissioned by the Carlton Club and was shown at the Royal Academy's Summer Exhibition of 1908. Sargent portrays him in a full-length view. The work is today in the collection of the National Portrait Gallery on Trafalgar Square in London, having been acquired in 2002.

== See also ==
- List of works by John Singer Sargent

== Bibliography ==
- Adams, Ralph James Q. Balfour: The Last Grandee. John Murray, 2007.
- Ellenberger, Nancy W. Balfour's World: Aristocracy and Political Culture at the Fin de Siècle. Boydell & Brewer, 2015.
