= Raymond Polin =

French philosopher

Raymond Polin (July 7, 1910, Briançon, Hautes-Alpes – February 8, 2001) was a French philosopher.

== Biography ==
Polin was born in 1910, and studied at the École normale supérieure, where he received his doctorate. He taught at the Lycée Condorcet and the University of Lille, before receiving a position at the Paris University in 1961.

He was the president of the University of Paris from 1976 to 1981.

== Literary works ==
Polin's works include:

- La création des valeurs, 1944
- La compréhension des valeurs, 1945
- Du laid, du mal, du faux, 1948
