= Fruit Dish =

Painting by Georges Braque

- Artist: Georges Braque
- Year: 1908-1909
- Medium: Oil on canvas
- Dimensions: 53 cm × 64 cm (21 in × 25 in)
- Location: Moderna Museet; Stockholm

Fruit Dish (French: Le Compotier) is an oil-on-canvas painting executed in 1908–1909 by Georges Braque. It has the dimensions of 53 by 64 cm. It his held at the Moderna Museet, in Stockholm.

After becoming influenced by Paul Cézanne, Braque went to embrace cubism in 1908, due to the influence of Pablo Picasso. This cubist still life depicts apples, pears, a lemon and perhaps a banana in and around a fruit bowl on a table. The still life became a usual theme for cubist painters. In this painting, where the influence of Cézanne and Picasso is apparent, the fruits and the bowl expand beyond the confines of a singular viewpoint, and the traditional notions of perspective are dissolved.
