= Georges Jean-Aubry =

French music critic and translator (1882–1950)

Georges Jean-Aubry (also Gérard Jean-Aubry, or G Jean-Aubry) was the pen-name of Jean-Frédéric-Emile Aubry (1882–1950), a French music critic and translator. He was a friend, translator and biographer of Joseph Conrad.

== Life ==
Born in Le Havre, Aubry was a friend of several composers, including Debussy and Ravel. In 1918 he met and befriended Conrad. From 1919 to 1930 he lived in London, editing a magazine The Chesterian. This publication was the house journal of the music publisher J & W Chester. In the 1930s he returned to France.

== Works ==
- French music of today, London: K. Paul, Trench, Trubner & co., ltd., 1919.
- La musique et les nations, Paris and London, 1922
- 'Lettres francaises de Joseph Conrad', Nouvelle Revue Francaise 135 ( I December 1924), pp. 108–16
- Joseph Conrad in the Congo, Boston: Little, Brown, 1926.
- Joseph Conrad: Life and Letters, 2 vols, Garden City, New York: Doubleday, Page, 1927.
- Une amitié exemplaire; Villiers de l'Isle Adam et Stéphane Mallarmé, d'après des documents inédits, 1942
- Lettres francaises, Paris: Gallimard, 1929
- (ed.) Poésies complètes by Jules Laforgue. Paris: Éditions de Cluny, 1943.
- (ed. with Henri Mondor) Œuvres complètes by Stéphane Mallarmé. Paris: Gallimard, 1945.
- André Gide et la musique, 1945
- Vie de Conrad, Paris: Gallimard, 1947. Translated 1957 as The Sea Dreamer: a definitive biography of Joseph Conrad, 1957.
- Valéry Larbaud, sa vie et son œuvre d'après des documents inédits, 1949
- (ed.) Lettres d'Alsace à sa nièce Madame Denis by Voltaire. Paris: Gallimard, 1960.
