= Allée des Acacias in the Bois de Boulogne =

1908 painting by Roger de La Fresnaye

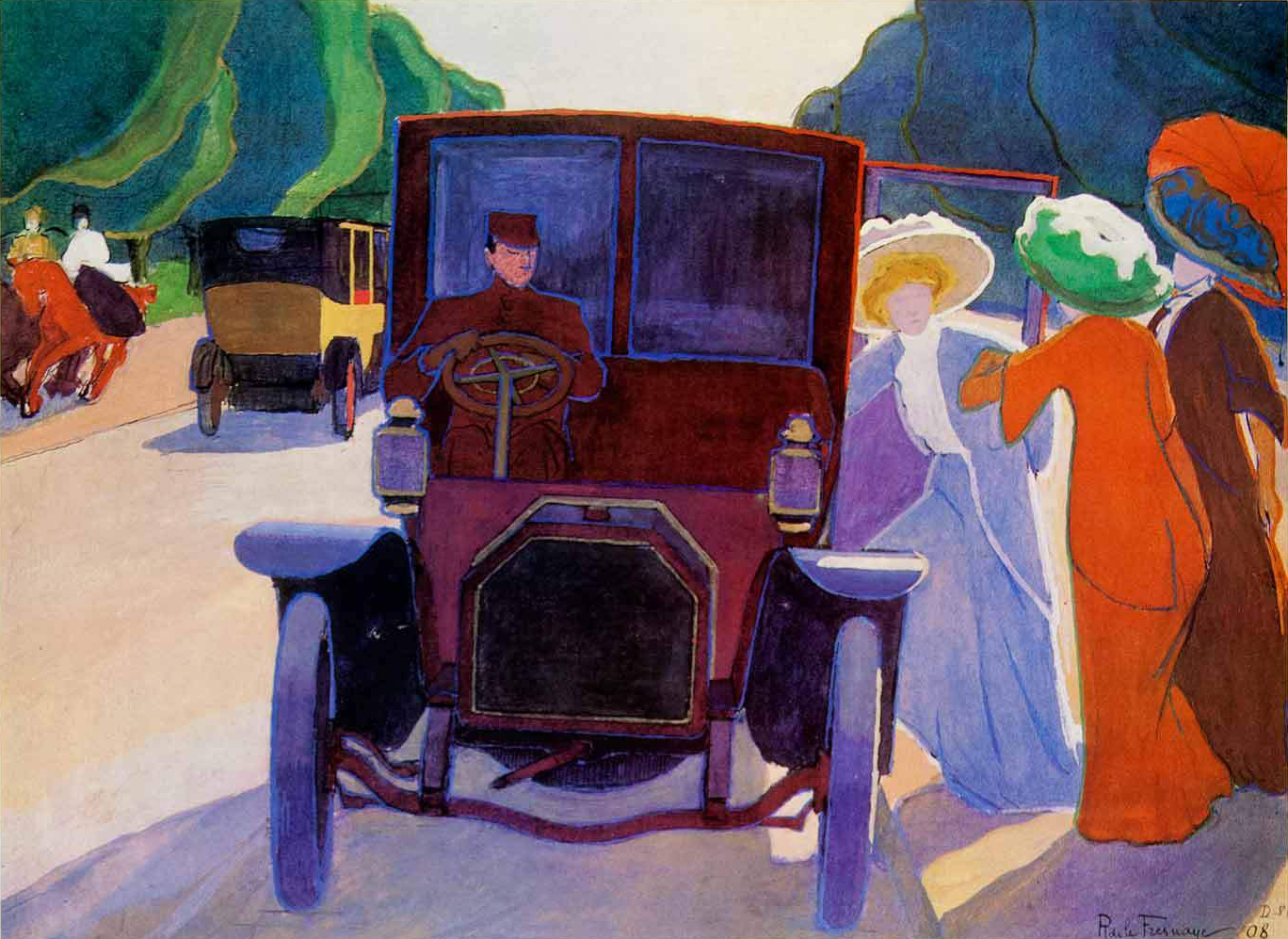
Allée des Acacias, in the Bois de Boulogne (1908) by Roger de La Fresnaye

Allée des Acacias, in the Bois de Boulogne is a gouache on card painting by French artist Roger de La Fresnaye, from 1908. It depicts a car on a street in the Bois de Boulogne, Paris. It is now in the Musée Carnavalet, Paris. It was once used on a poster promoting cars made by the painter's brother.
