= Karin at the Shore =

Painting by Carl Larsson

- Karin vid stranden (Swedish)
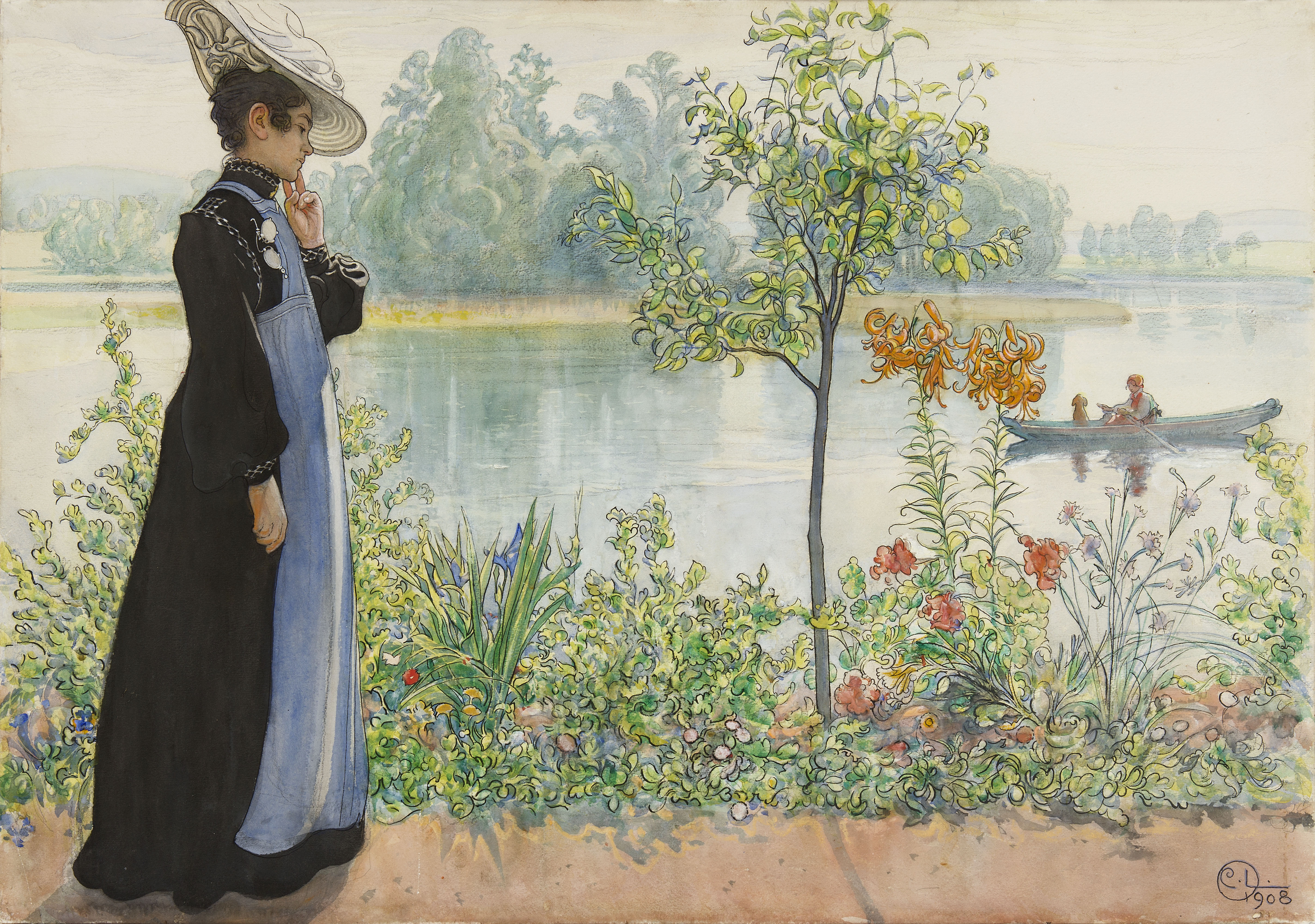
- Artist: Carl Larsson
- Year: 1908
- Type: watercolor
- Location: Malmö Art Museum; Malmö

Karin at the Shore is a watercolor by Carl Larsson from 1908.

== Description ==
The watercolor depicts Carl Larsson's wife Karin Larsson in the garden outside their home Lilla Hyttnäs at Sundbornsån in Dalarna, on a sunny day.

The watercolor was reproduced in Carl Larsson's On the sunny side: a book about the dwelling, about children, about you, about flowers, about everything: outside the home, which was published in 1910. It contains reproductions of 32 paintings with text.

== Provenance ==
The painting was purchased by the City of Malmö in the Baltic Exhibition from 1914. It is held by the Malmö Art Museum.
