= Midvinterblot =

1915 painting by Carl Larsson

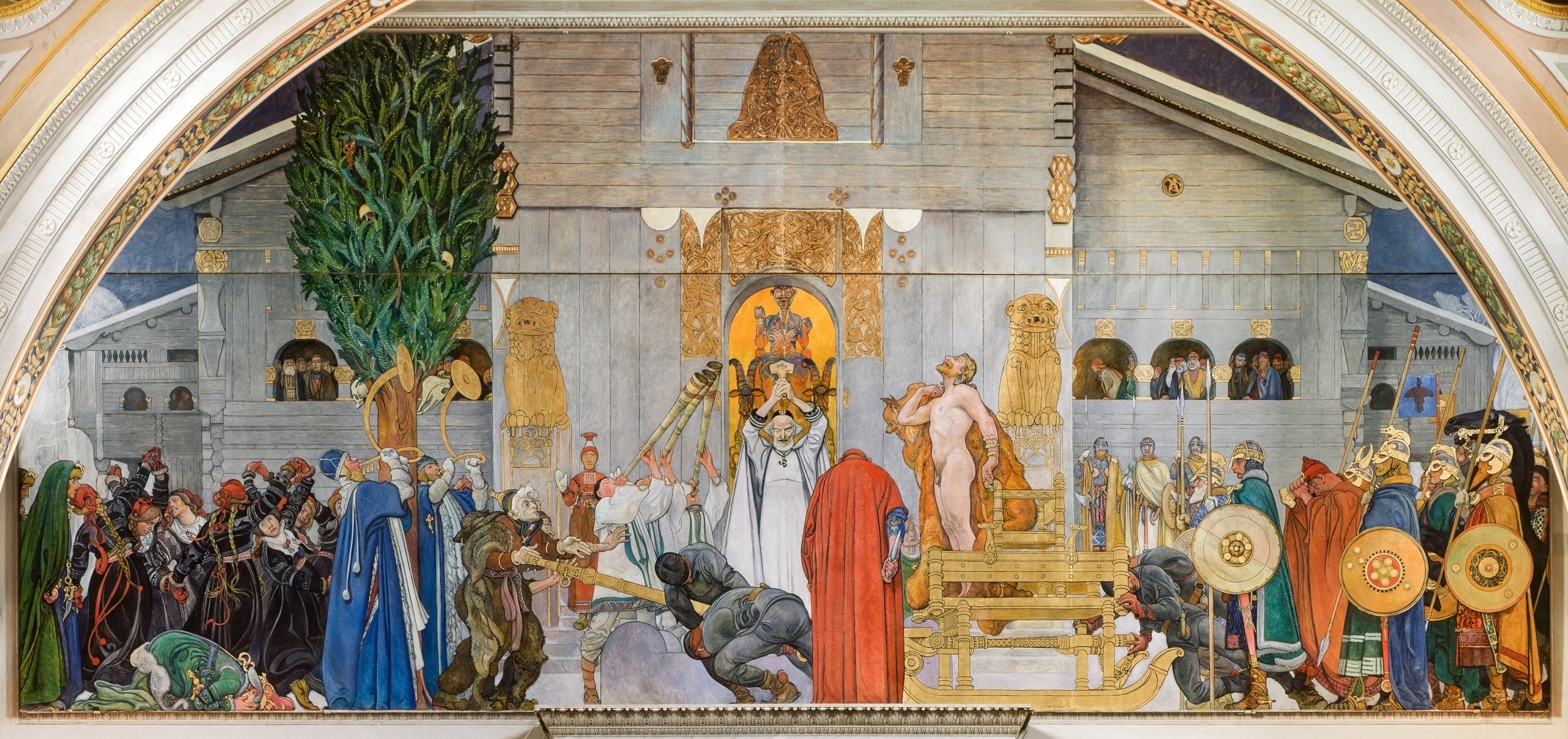
- Artist: Carl Larsson
- Year: 1915
- Medium: Oil on canvas
- Dimensions: 640 cm × 1360 cm (250 in × 540 in)
- Location: Nationalmuseum, Stockholm

Midvinterblot (Swedish for "Midwinter blót") is a painting by the Swedish painter Carl Larsson, created in 1915 for the hall of the central staircase in Nationalmuseum in Stockholm. It has been called Sweden's most controversial painting.

The painting depicts a legend from Norse mythology in which the Swedish king Domalde is sacrificed to avert famine. After long debate, the painting was rejected by the museum; but the controversy resurfaced in the late 20th century, and the painting finally was placed where Carl Larsson had intended.

== Background ==
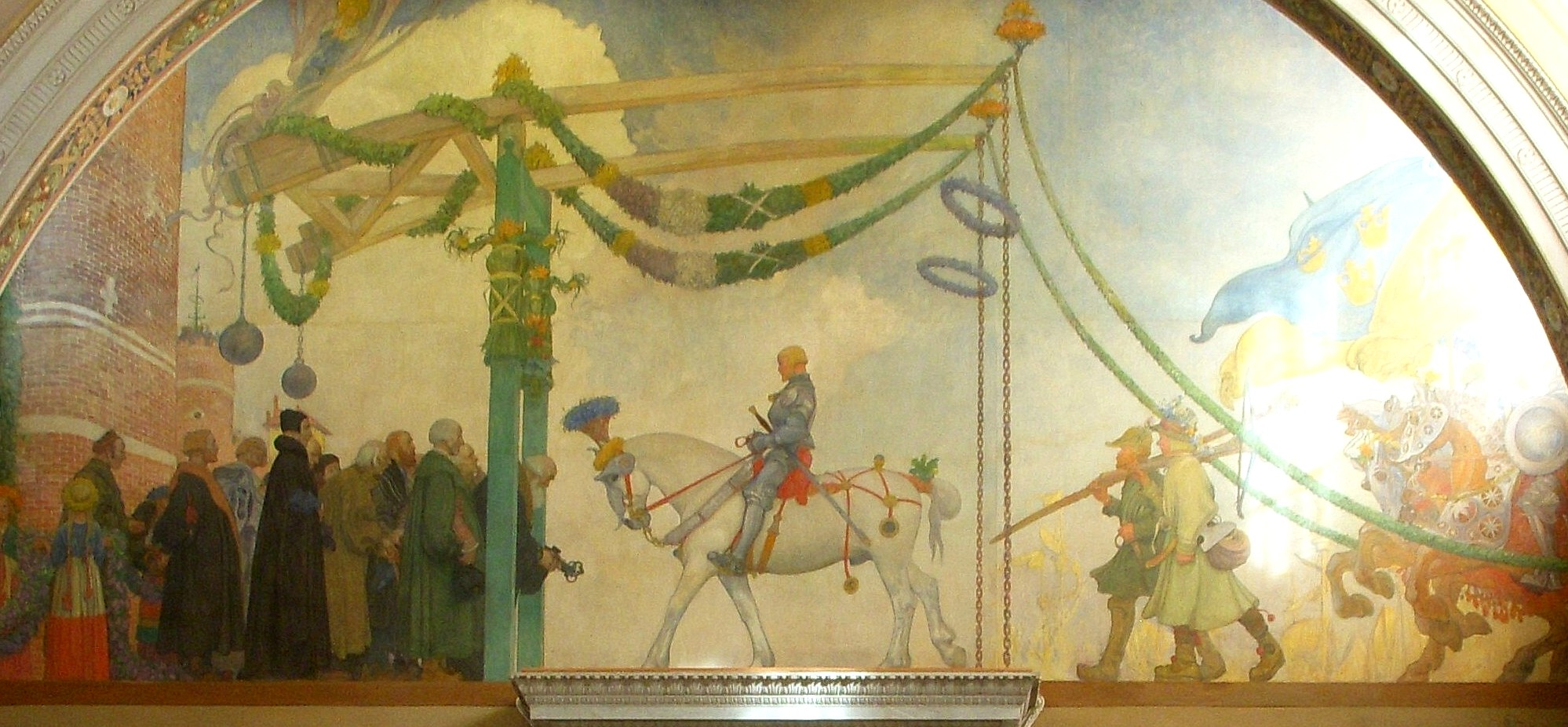
The painting Gustav Vasa enters Stockholm 1523, which Midvinterblot was intended to contrast

Larsson was commissioned to decorate all the walls of the central staircase in the museum except for one, and he wanted to decorate the last wall as well. He intended the last wall to present a contrast to the other illustrations of the staircase. Whereas the painting Gustav Vasa enters Stockholm 1523 presented a midsummer theme with a triumphant king, Larsson wanted the last illustration to be a midwinter theme with a king who sacrificed himself for his people.

== Sources and inspiration ==
Larsson went to Copenhagen to visit the National Museum of Denmark where he copied the ornamentation of an Iron Age fibula. The literary sources that inspired Larsson were Adam of Bremen and Snorri Sturluson. On the subject of the Temple at Uppsala, Adam of Bremen had written:

In this temple, built entirely of gold, the people worship the statues of three gods. These images are arranged so that Thor, the most powerful, has his throne in the middle of the group of three. On either side of him sit Othin and Freyr. [...] Near that temple is a very large tree with widespread branches which are always green both in winter and summer. What kind of tree it is nobody knows. There is also a spring there where the pagan are accustomed to perform sacrifices and to immerse a human being alive. As long as his body is not found, the request of the people will be fulfilled.

Snorri Sturluson wrote on the subject of the sacrifice of the king:

Domald took the heritage left by his father Visbur, and ruled over the land. As in his time there was great famine and distress, the Swedes made great offerings of sacrifice at Upsal. The first autumn they sacrificed oxen, but the succeeding season was not improved thereby. The following autumn they sacrificed men, but the succeeding year was rather worse. The third autumn, when the offer of sacrifices should begin, a great multitude of Swedes came to Upsal; and now the chiefs held consultations with each other, and all agreed that the times of scarcity were on account of their king Domald, and they resolved to offer him for good seasons, and to assault and kill him, and sprinkle the stalle of the gods with his blood. And they did so.

== Evolution of the work ==
=== First version ===
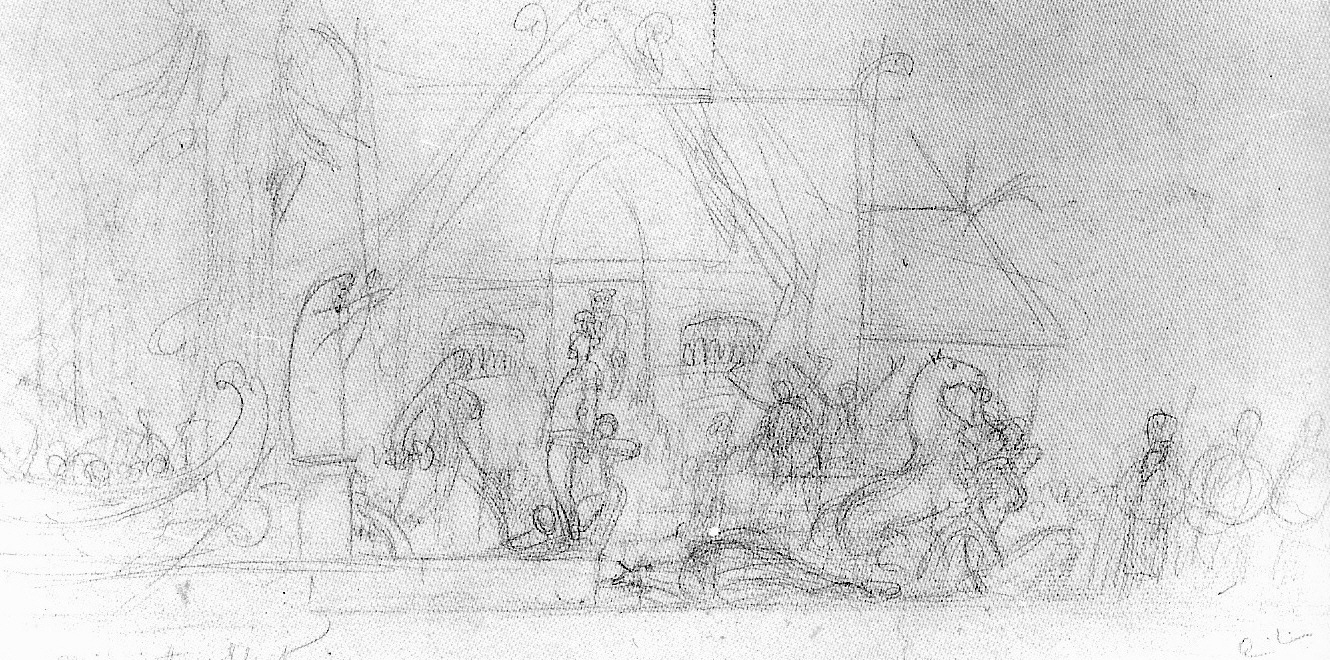
The first sketch (No. 236) from 1910

The earliest known sketch (No. 236) is made in graphite and is located in the Carl Larsson museum in Sundborn. It was dated by Karl Axel Arvidsson to a time shortly after the visit to Copenhagen in 1910. In July, Larsson started to paint a large version, which was finished in January 1911, but it is only preserved in a photograph. It is based on the early sketch but it presents a richer set of figures in the foreground. The early version was put on display in Nationalmuseum without receiving any official comments. There was no formal order and no official contest had been declared, and the initiative was only Larsson's.

An anonymous writer calling himself "Archaeologist" voiced harsh criticism in Dagens Nyheter on February 20, 1911. The writer stated that there were several anachronisms in the painting which had been combined freely. The anonymous writer called the temple a "summer restaurant" decorated with motives from the Biological museum in Stockholm and he considered the dresses in the painting to be as preposterous as a Swedish farm with camels walking around the dunghill.

=== Second version ===
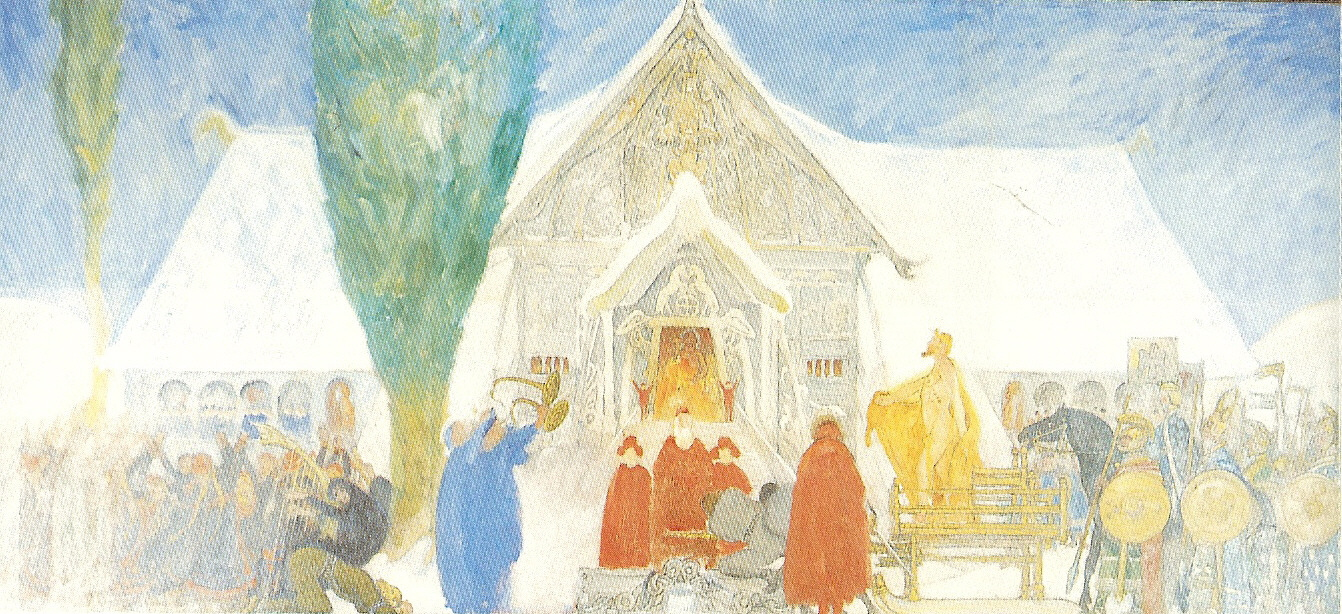
The second sketch (No. 237) from 1913

The criticism of the artistic freedom of giving a personal interpretation of a distant historic event could have been directed at many other historic paintings of the 19th century. The criticism of Midvinterblot would be in the same vein during the following years. Larsson retorted that he would happily delegate the task to a younger talent—but he made a second version in oil (No. 237) in which he made the temple wider and where he added an executioner in the centre. The sets of characters were more closely assembled and the frieze-like quality was enhanced.

=== Third version ===
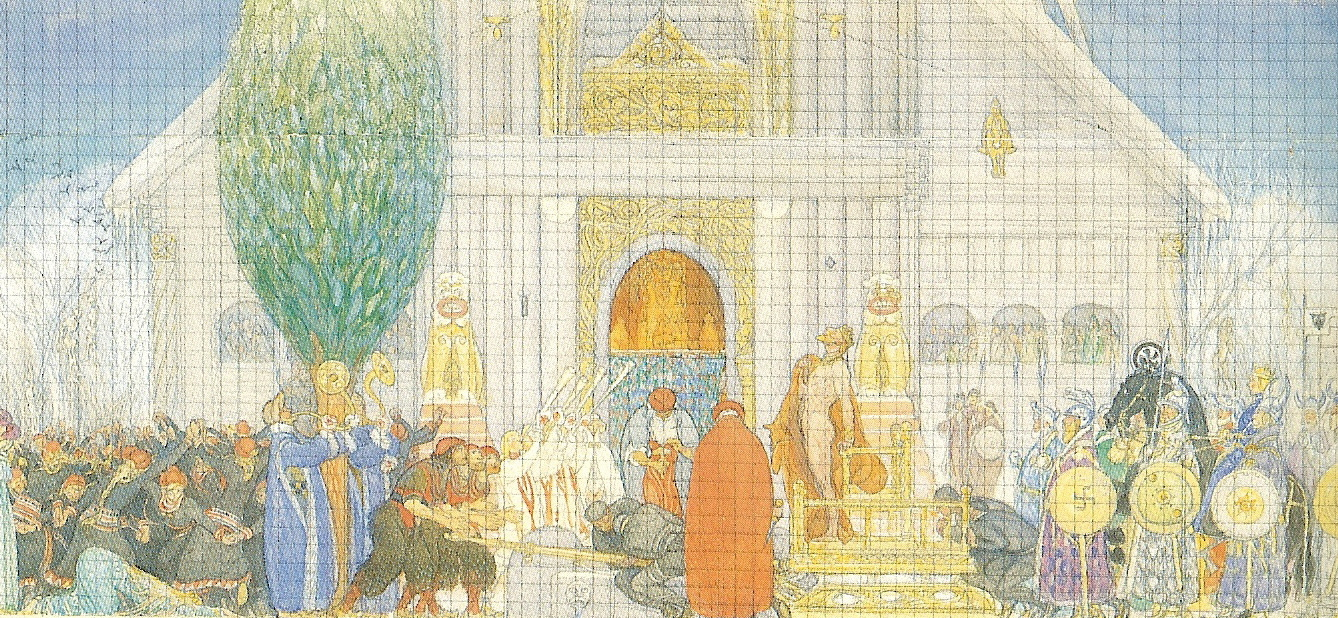
The third sketch (No. 238) from 1913

Some major changes were introduced in a third watercolour painting (No. 238) which he made during the autumn of 1913. This version was given the text "En drömsyn. En konung offras för folket" ("A dream vision, a king sacrificed for his people"), a text which was possibly added in the hope that it would not be considered to be an attempt at a historically faithful reconstruction.

The most essential change consisted of a more monumental composition. The temple had been enlarged considerably and given a more stern shape, and the figures had been more closely assembled and they formed an unbroken relief-like row. The sketch was put on exhibition in the museum in November 1913 and in a letter to Ludvig Looström, the director of the museum, Larsson offered the painting for 35,000 Swedish kronor.

This version was criticised even before the museum board had had time to present their own view. August Brunius, who had expressed his enthusiasm for the Gustav Vasa painting, reacted against the choice of subject, like most critics. The choice of subject was only aggravated by the way it was presented. Brunius felt the painting to be unreal, unbelievable and not very relevant for the modern Swedes of the early 20th century.

On January 17, 1914, the museum's board presented their ambivalent view on the painting. The majority of the board seconded the motion that Larsson was to finish Midvinterblot for the museum wall, but they added the reservation that the main scene with the sacrifice of a king should be excluded or downplayed. The director of the museum, Looström, objected to the board's ruling, and he declared the painting illustrated a "ritual killing" and he would rather the wall remain empty. Carl Larsson received the ruling of the board as a confirmation that the museum accepted his painting, but he declared that he would not make the suggested changes, nor would he accept the suggestion that the painting should be installed in the Stockholm City Hall instead.

Even Larsson's good friend and biographer Georg Nordensvan joined the critics, but he could not sway Larsson's determination either, although Larsson probably took his criticism hardest. The archaeologist Bror Schnittger, who was probably the anonymous writer who had initiated the criticism, launched additional criticism in Svenska Dagbladet against the lack of historical authenticity in the painting. The distance in dating among the objects in the painting was given as at least 2000 years and Schnittger thought that the painting was unacceptable in the museum building. Larsson stated that he intentionally included objects that would be from the distant past in relation to the setting of the painting, and that he did not see these as anachronisms, because he imagined the subjects would be antiquarians who kept ancient items as ritual objects.

On March 1, 1914, Larsson, who was by then ostracized, wrote a letter to the minister of religious affairs and declared that he resigned from the task of illustrating the museum wall.

=== The final versions and rejection ===
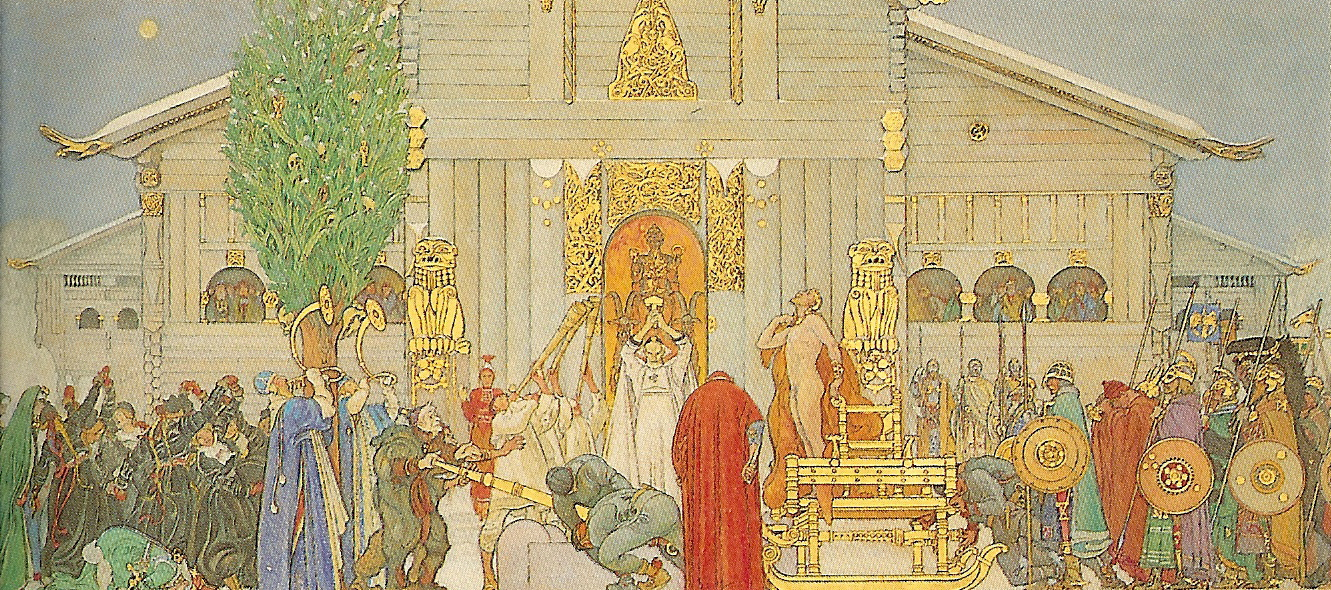
The fourth sketch (No. 239) from 1915

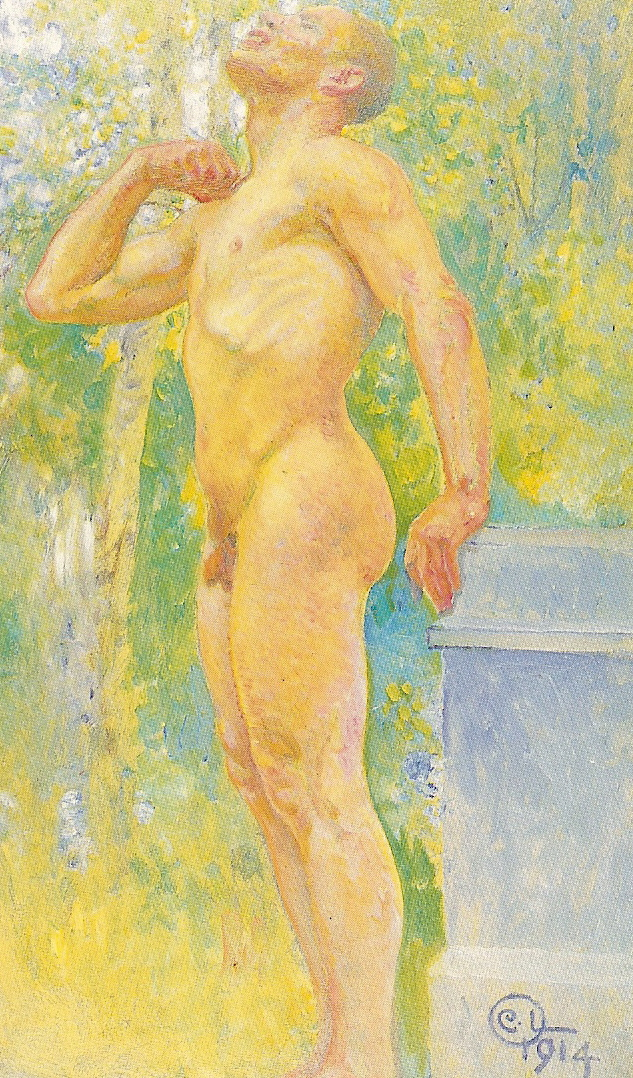
The study of king Domalde (No. 240) from 1914

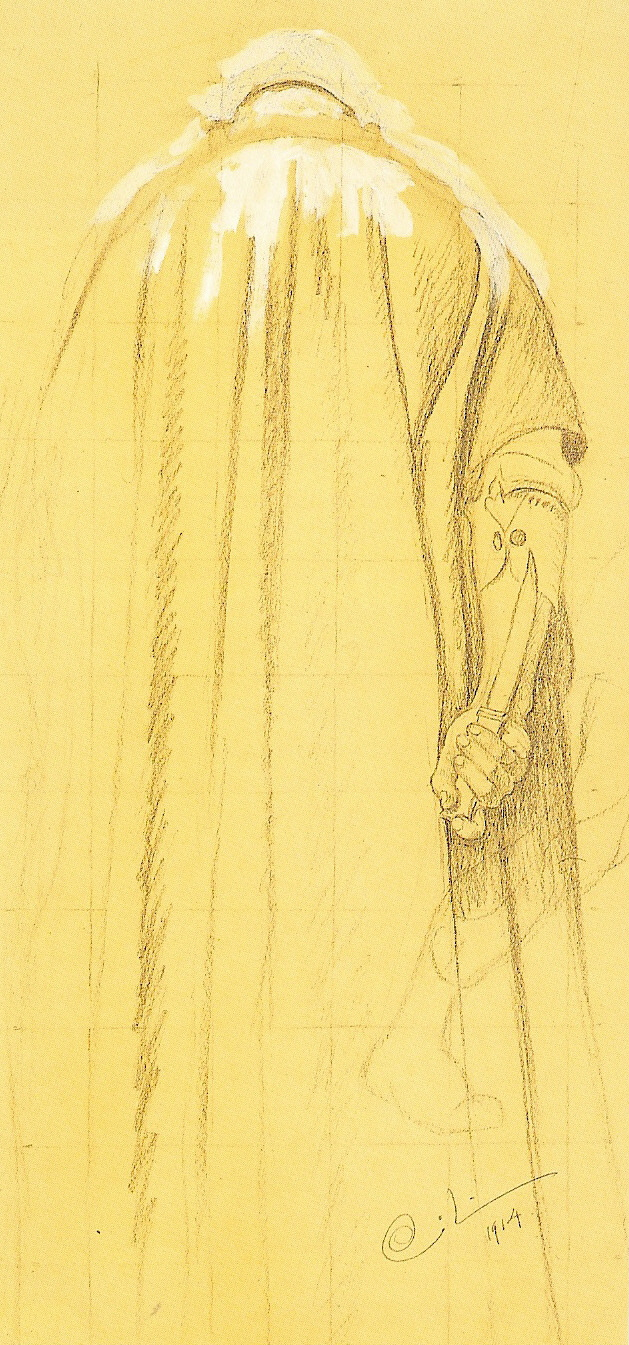
The wizard (No. 241) from 1914

In May 1914, Carl Larsson resumed the work on the painting on his own initiative. During 1915, he presented a painted sketch (No. 239), which was largely consistent with the previous painting. The king had been remade based on an oil painting (No. 240) that Larsson had made with a male model named Rydberg in 1914. The king's position was more pathetically composed and expressive and it agreed more with the change of emphasis that had taken place during the evolution of the work after Larsson's decision that the sacrifice was voluntary.

A new figure, a wizard, had been added to the left of the sleighs and the lion guardians at the entry of the temple, which received a noticeably Chinese character. The colours are forceful and there are considerable amounts of gold, something that Larsson intended as a disclaimer of the common notion that pre-history was gray.

Before the final decision, both the board and Carl Larsson knew that the Minister of Education (at the time called Minister of Religious Affairs) was favourable towards the new painting. However, a majority of the board, including the former director Looström and his successor Richard Bergh, was against it, and only two were in favour. Instead, the board asked Larsson to make a different painting. Larsson did not answer initially, but he declared in the press that he still considered Midvinterblot to be among the greatest and most beautiful works he had ever made.

The minister asked for expert advice and the debate continued in the newspapers. There were suspicions that there was a political side to the animosity between Bergh and Larsson, but these suspicions were convincingly dispelled much later by Prince Eugén, Duke of Närke in a personal letter.

A book on Carl Larsson, published by Nationalmuseum in 1992, claims that the most immediate and natural explanation for the ultimate rejection of the painting was that time had rendered the painting unfashionable. Because of the long debate, the painting became a survivor from a time past and it could not meet the modernist ideals of the new century.

The final version was exhibited where it was intended to be in June 1915. In the following year, it was shown at the art gallery Liljevalchs konsthall as its first exhibit was dedicated to Carl Larsson, Bruno Liljefors and Anders Zorn. It was tentatively shown again in Nationalmuseum during the period 1925–1933. In 1942, the painting was stored at the Archive for Public Decorative Art (now renamed the Museum of Sketches) in Lund, where it was prominently on show for forty years.

According to the book by Nationalmuseum, the controversy concerned Carl Larsson's personal prestige and the ideals that he stood for, but his contemporaries would turn more and more indifferent to these ideals. The events embittered his last years and he declared in his autobiography that the controversy broke him down and that he admitted it with anger. It is clear that he began to identify himself with the work and it is possible that he also identified himself with the sacrificed king, as he primarily saw conspiracies and bad intentions behind the opposition. This identification was made apparent in his self-portrait, in 1916, where he presented himself as king Domalde, and which he donated to Sundborn parish where he lived.

== The later controversy and eventual acceptance ==
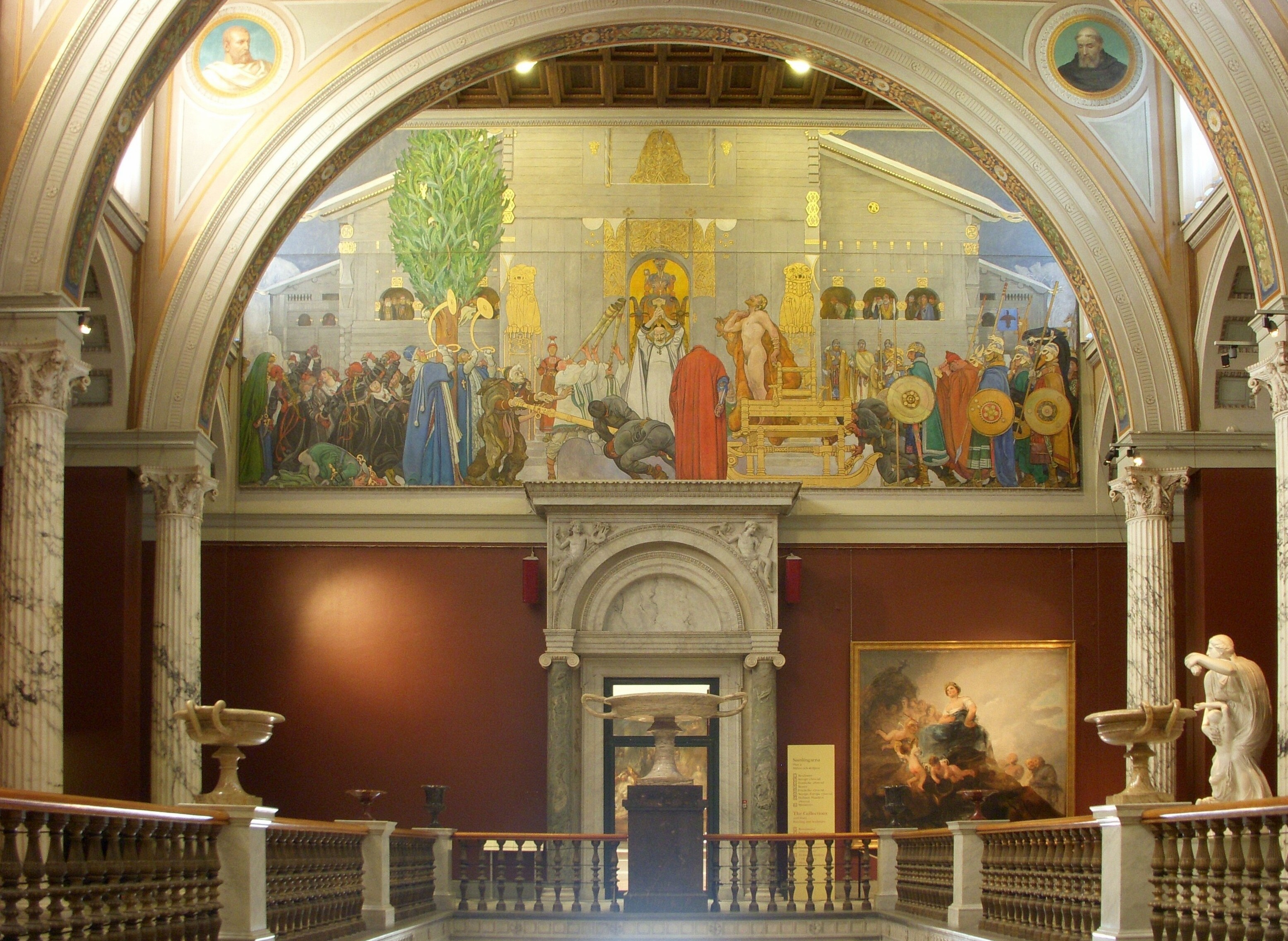
In 1997, the painting was finally installed in the place for which it was made (picture taken in 2008).

During 1983–1984, the painting was exhibited at the Swedish History Museum in Stockholm, and after this exhibit an art dealer offered to donate or sell the painting to Nationalmuseum. The board rejected the offer with the statement that the Old Norse motif was more appropriate for the Swedish History Museum, which at the time still shared the same building as Nationalmuseum. When the Swedish History Museum had been moved to a building of its own, the painting should be moved there too.

After this rejection, the painting was sold to art collector Carl-Eric Björkegren, who offered to sell it to the Swedish History Museum for 12 million Swedish kronor. This offer caused a controversy in which people debated if the painting belonged to Nationalmuseum or the Swedish History Museum. In this debate where there were exaggerations in both directions, people claimed that the painting was both an unsurpassed masterpiece of Swedish art and a work of suspect morality. In 1987, it was sold by Sotheby's in London to a Japanese art collector.

In 1992, Nationalmuseum celebrated its bicentennial anniversary and dedicated the exhibit to Carl Larsson. The Japanese owner lent the painting to the museum, and when the 300,000 visitors of the late 20th century were able to see the work for the first time in the hall where it was intended to be, the general opinion changed.

In 1997, Nationalmuseum bought the painting from the collector, ordered a frame for stretching the canvas from Per Målare, a carpenter in Gagnef, Dalarna, and installed it permanently where Carl Larsson had intended it to be.

== Bibliography ==
Media related to Midvinterblot at Wikimedia Commons

- Gunnarsson, Torsten, ed. (1992). Carl Larsson. Stockholm: Nationalmuseum och Göteborgs Konstmuseum. ISBN 91-7024-764-1.
- Moynihan, Michael (2007). "Carl Larsson's Greatest Sacrifice". In Joshua Buckley; Michael Moynihan (eds.). TYR: Myth Culture Tradition. Vol. 3. Atlanta: Ultra Press. ISBN 978-0-9720292-3-0.
