= Langewiesche =

Langewiesche may refer to:

- Dieter Langewiesche (born 1943), German historian
- Karl Robert Langewiesche (1874–1931), German publisher
- William Langewiesche (1955–2025), American author and journalist; son of Wolfgang Langewiesche
- Wolfgang Langewiesche (1907–2002), aviator, author and journalist; father of William Langewiesche
