= Gustav Vasa Enters Stockholm 1523 =

Painting by Carl Larsson

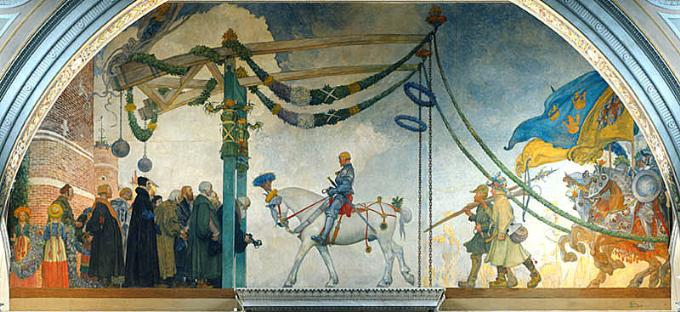
- Artist: Carl Larsson
- Year: 1908
- Medium: Oil on canvas
- Dimensions: 700 cm × 1400 cm (280 in × 550 in)
- Location: Nationalmuseum; Stockholm

Gustav Vasa Enters Stockholm 1523 (Swedish: Gustav Vasas intåg i Stockholm 1523) is a painting painted for the Nationalmuseum in Stockholm by the Swedish painter Carl Larsson. It was completed in 1908. The painting depicts Gustav Vasa of Sweden as he is about to enter Stockholm in 1523 to be king.

Larsson started planning to paint the picture in 1897, but was not allowed to start working until November 1906. The canvasses were largely completed by November 1907, and were hung on the walls on Nationalmuseum on January 28, 1908.
