= Sundborn =

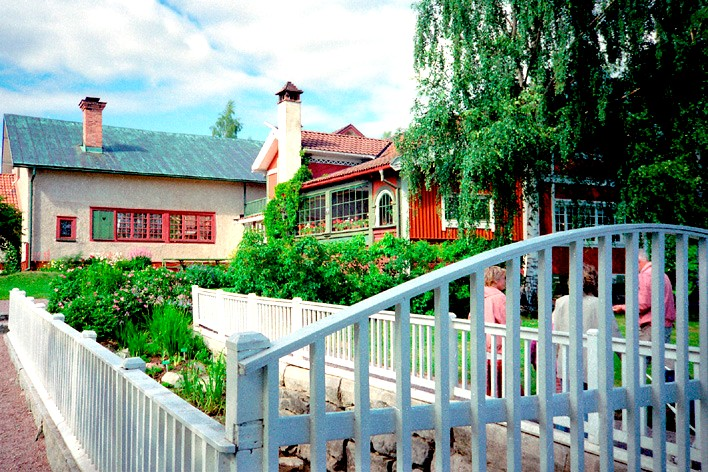
- The Carl Larsson house

- Location within Dalarna Location within Sweden
- Coordinates: 60°40′N 15°46′E
- Country: Sweden
- Province: Dalarna
- County: Dalarna County
- Municipality: Falun Municipality

Area
  - Total: 0.88 km^{2} (0.34 sq mi)

Population (31 December 2010)
  - Total: 762
  - Density: 871/km^{2} (2,260/sq mi)
- Time zone: UTC+1 (CET)
  - Summer (DST): UTC+2 (CEST)
- Climate: Dfb

Sundborn (Swedish pronunciation: [ˈsɵ̂nː(d)boːɳ]) is a locality situated in Falun Municipality, Dalarna County, Sweden with 762 inhabitants in 2010.

The painter Carl Larsson and his wife, textile artist Karin Larsson, lived in the cottage Lilla Hyttnäs in Sundborn. Their home is preserved as the biographical museum Carl Larsson-gården. The cyclist Erik Jansson was born here too
