= Carl Larsson-gården =

Historic house museum in Dalarna, Sweden

Coordinates: 60°39′01″N 15°46′34″E

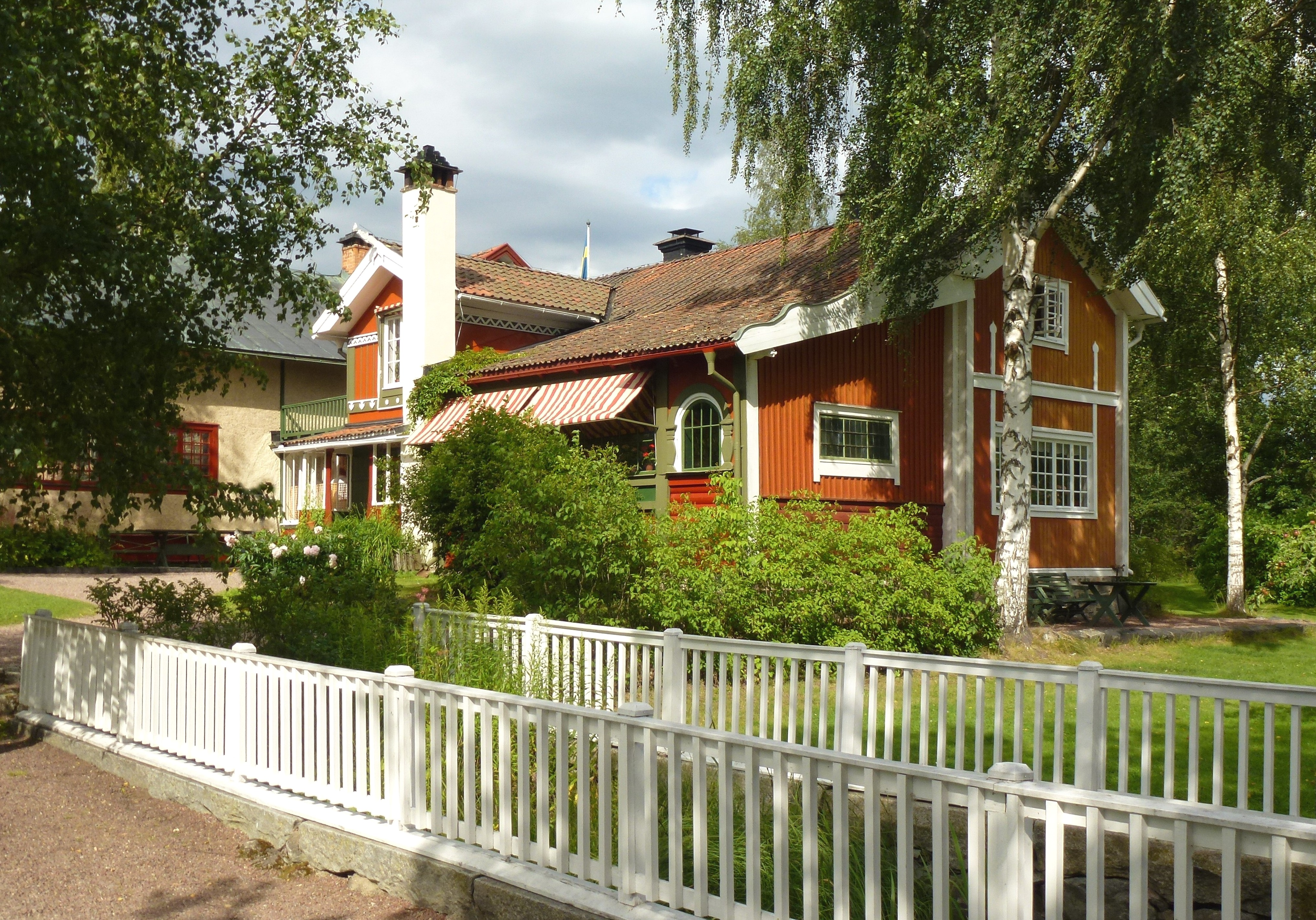
- Interactive map of the Carl Larsson-gården area

General information
- Location: Sundborn, Sweden

Carl Larsson-gården (The Carl Larsson cottage) is the name given to Lilla Hyttnäs, a house located in the village of Sundborn outside Falun in Dalarna. The artists Carl Larsson and Karin Larsson lived here between the years 1889 and 1912. Since 1946, Lilla Hyttnäs has been managed by Carl and Karin Larsson's estate, as a historic home and museum.

In September 2025, Lilla Hyttnäs was listed as part of the Swedish cultural canon, intended to create a shared cultural identity for Swedish citizens and new arrivals to the country.

== History ==
In 1888, Carl and Karin Larsson received Lilla Hyttnäs, a cottage built in 1837, from Karin's father Adolf Bergöö. As early as 1889, they started spending summers at the house, and in 1901, the family moved to Sundborn permanently. The Larssons began to decorate their home and the simple cottage was transformed into one of Sweden's most famous homes. The Larssons created their own style, which was influenced by the National Romantic style and the interior design ideas of the British artist William Morris, as well as the Arts and Crafts movement. Simple furniture and clear colors dominate the interior, a departure from contemporary bourgeois ideals of heavy, dark furnishings.

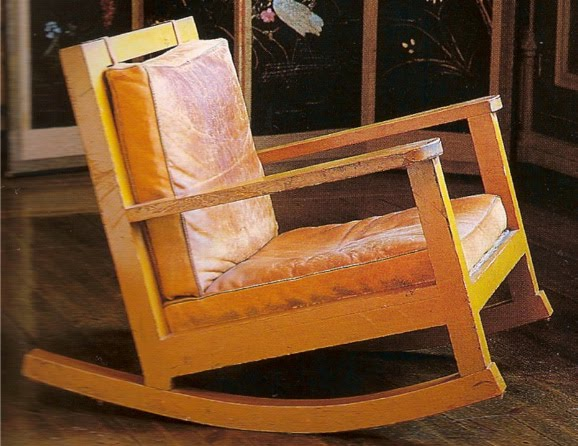
Rocking chair designed by Karin Larsson in front of a Japanese folding screen.

In Lilla Hyttnäs, Karin Larsson found an outlet for her artistry by designing furniture and weaving the fabrics and tapestries found across the house. Her designs were revolutionary while also borrowing from already established styles: "Pre-modern in character they introduced a new abstract style in tapestry. Her bold compositions were executed in vibrant colours... she reinterpreted Japanese motifs... [and] explored folk techniques".

In several books Carl Larsson described and depicted in paintings his home and family life at Sundborn. These were "A Home" (1899), "The Larssons" (1902) and "On the Sunny Side" (1910). It was through their popularity that Carl Larsson-gården became so influential in the development of Swedish interior design.

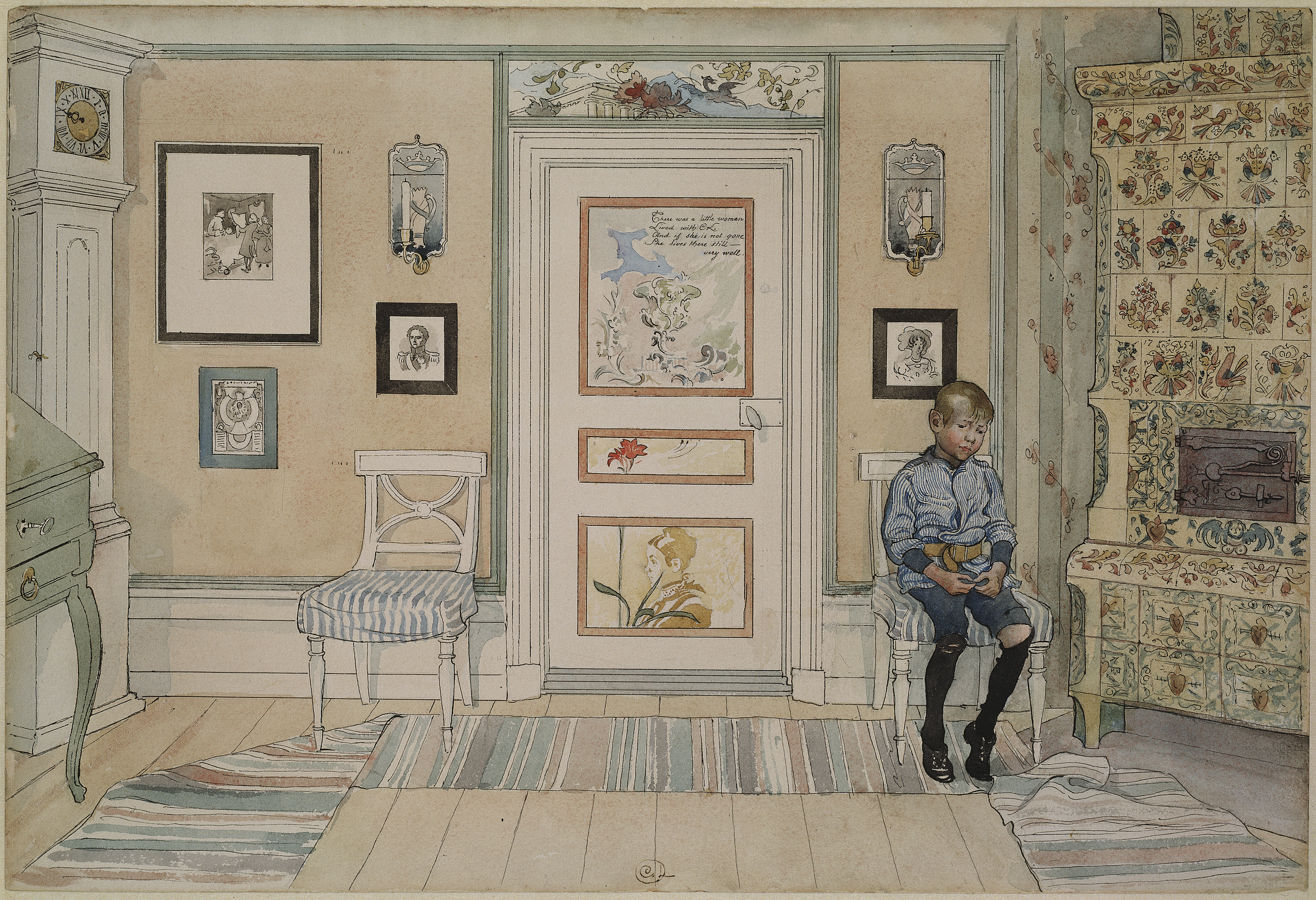
In the Corner (1895) — a watercolour depiction of the drawing room by Carl Larsson — from the book "A Home"

Moved from Aspeboda to Falun in 1912, the Miner's Cottage was the last addition to the house. The interior of the cabin contained unique ceiling and wall paintings from 1742 that Carl Larsson wanted to save from destruction.

Carl and Karin Larsson died in 1919 and 1928 respectively. Subsequently, their children donated their inheritance lots to form Carl and Karin Larsson's family association in 1946 which has managed Carl Larsson-gården ever since. In 1966, it was designated a listed building. In 2014, the garden surrounding the house was restored to how it would have originally looked during Carl and Karin Larsson's time.

Adjacent to the artists' home is an exhibition hall and an archive and library with books, photographs, and documents.

== Gallery ==
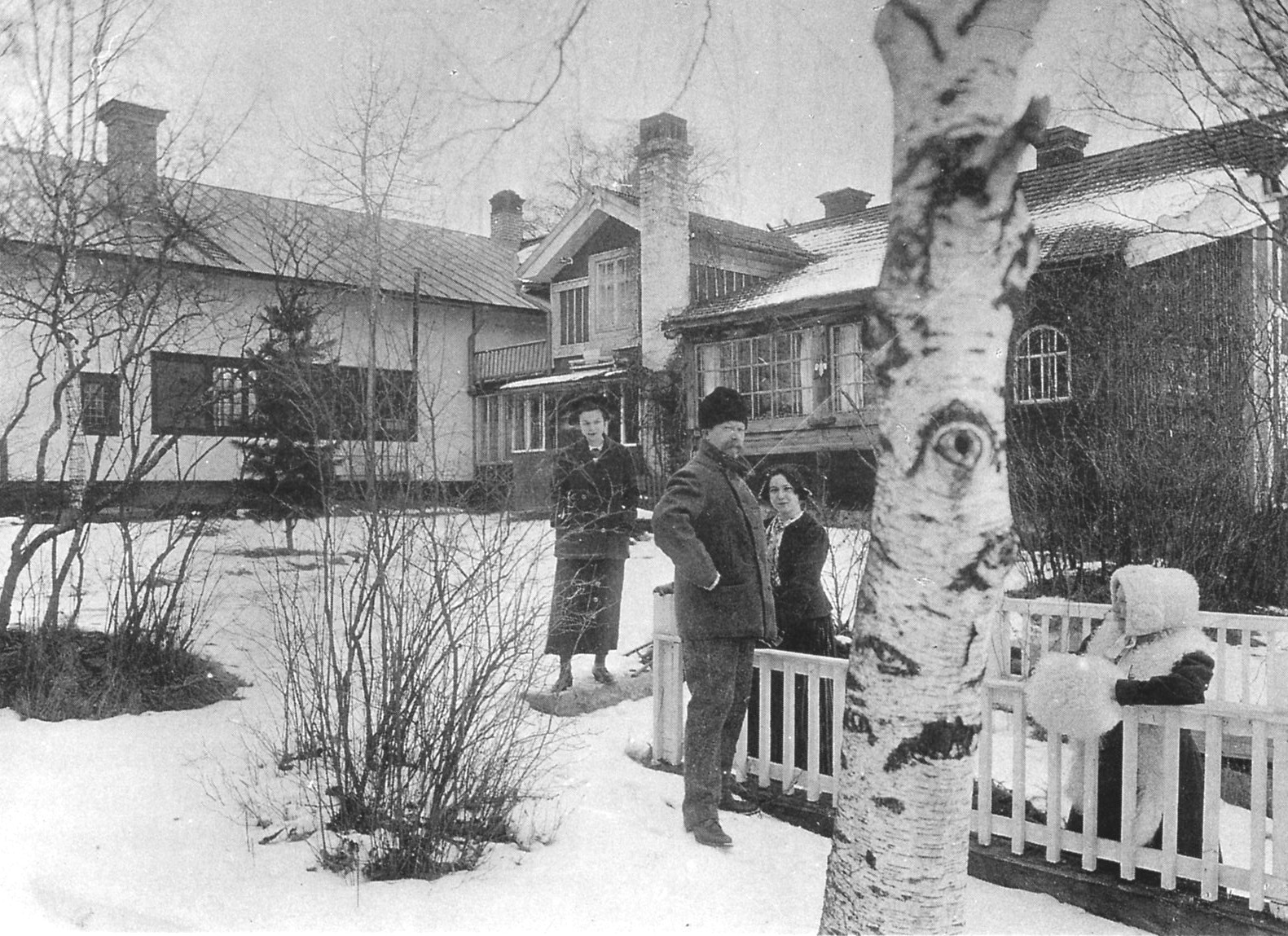
Carl Larsson with his daughters Kersti, Britta, and Suzanne at Lilla Hyttnäs, 1911.

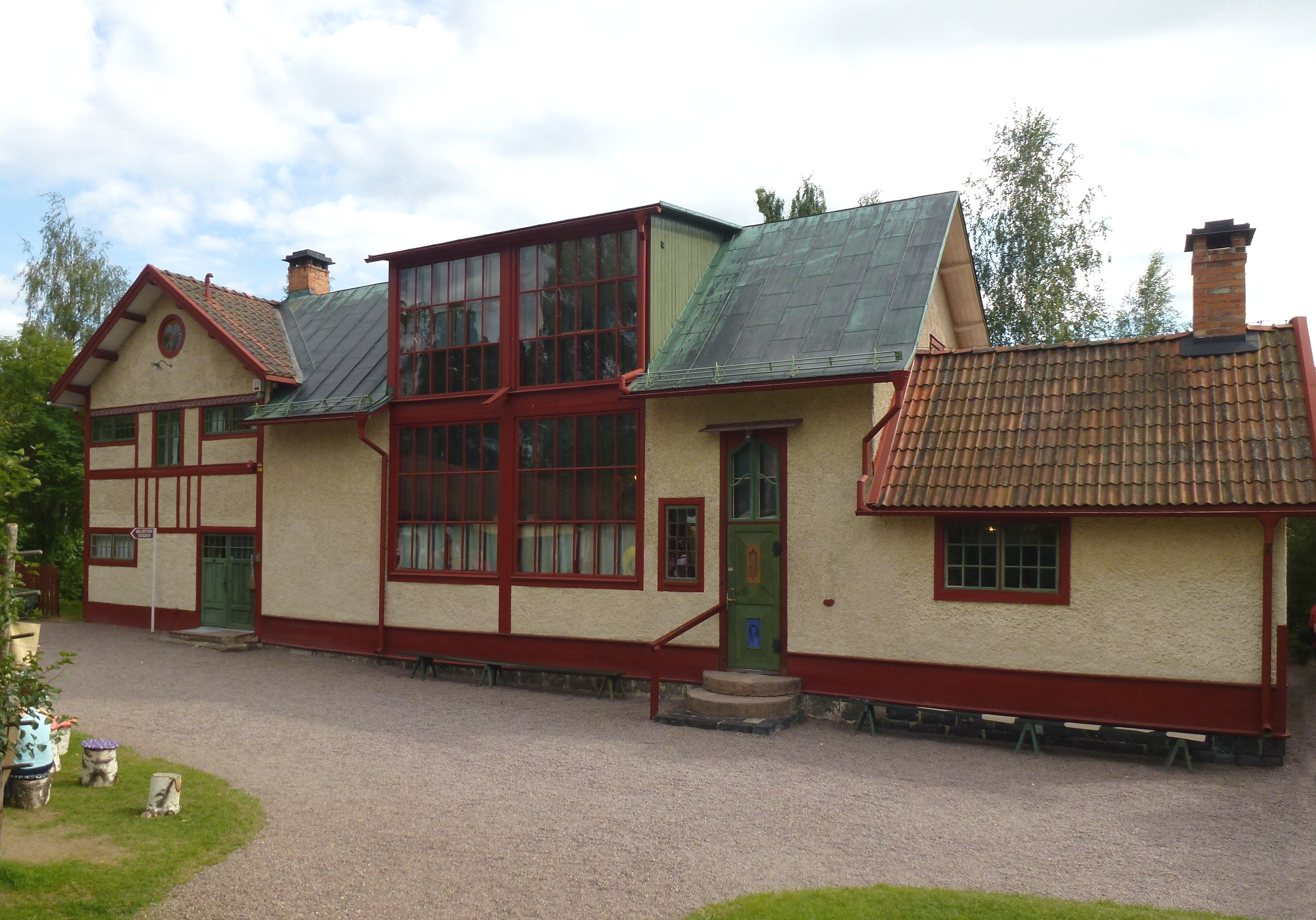
The north facade

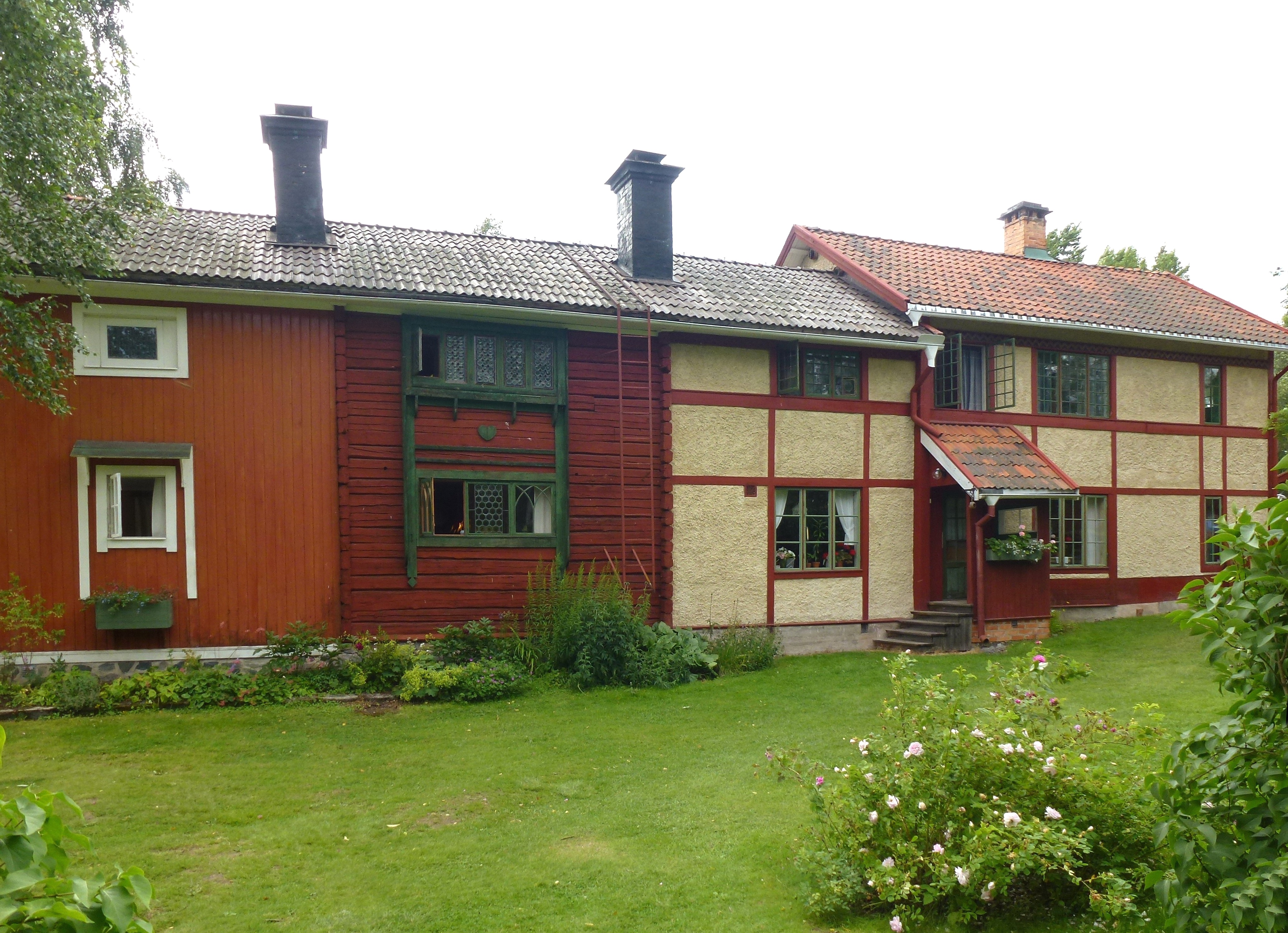
The east facade

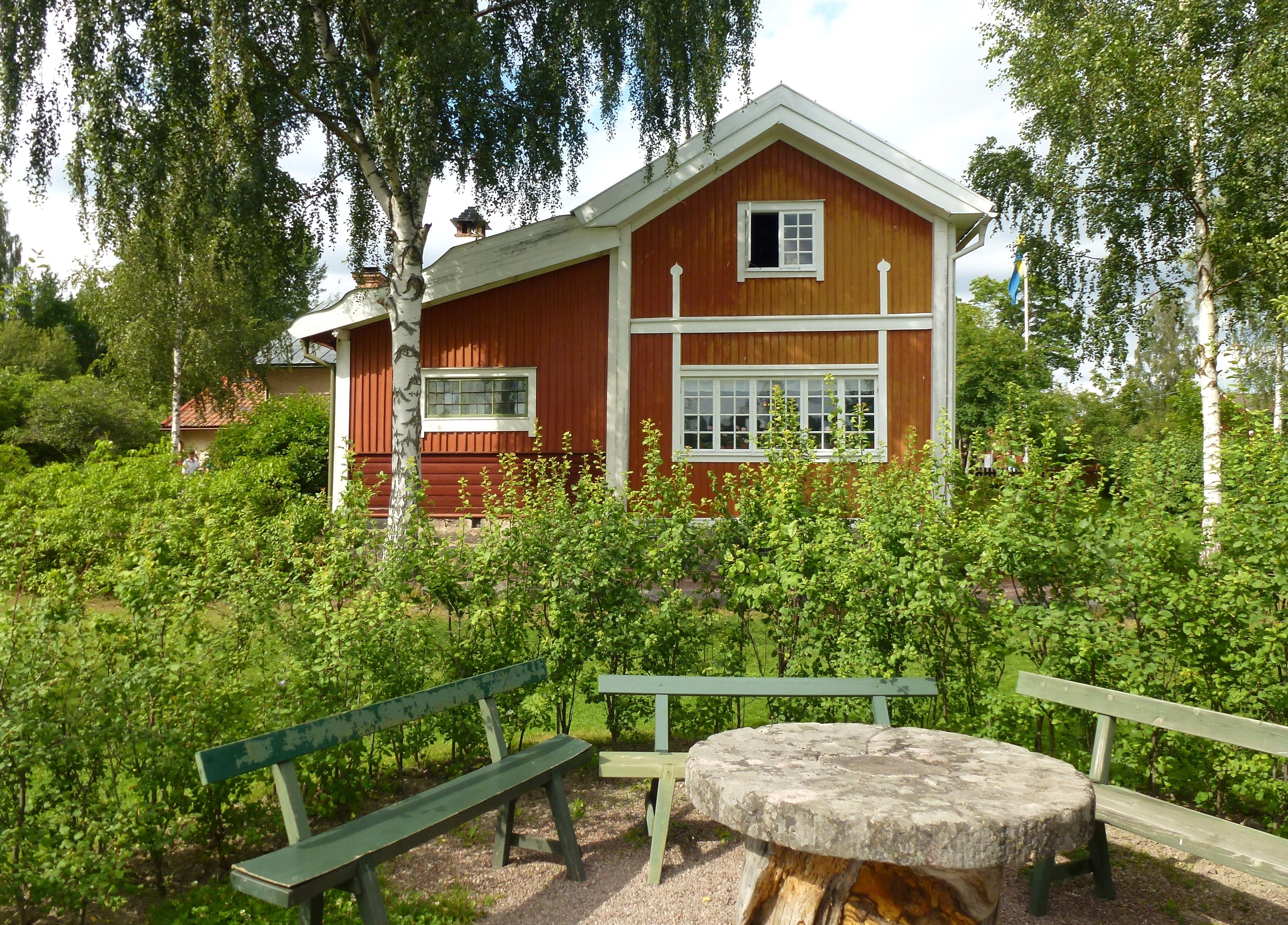
The south facade

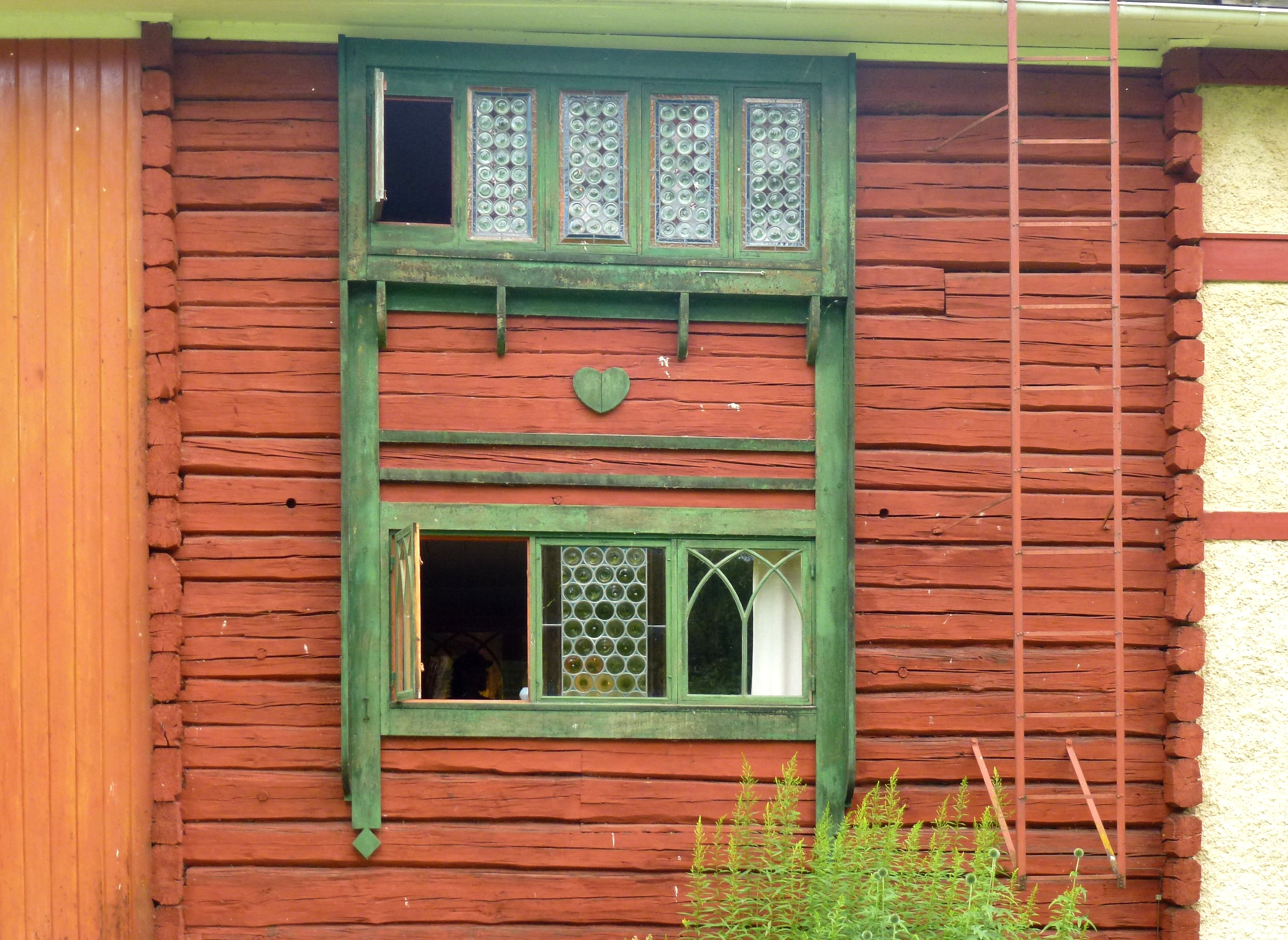
Detail from the east facade
