= Carl Larsson =

Swedish painter (1853–1919)

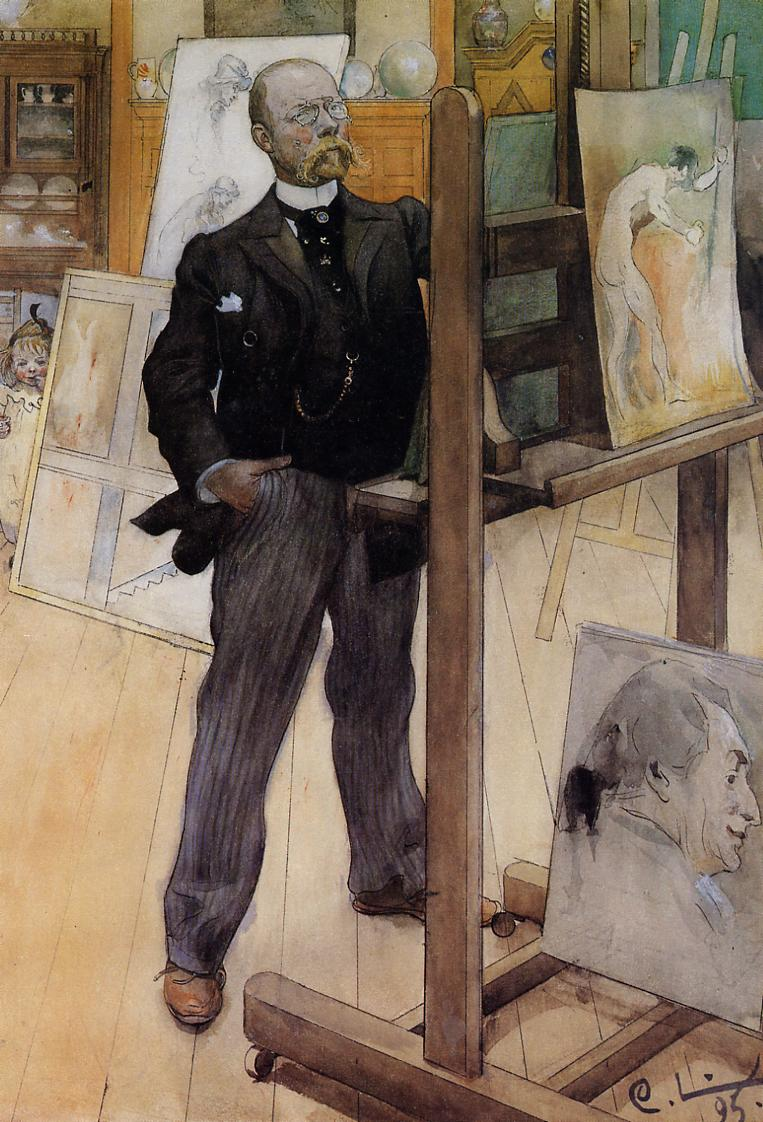
- Self-portrait, 1895
- Born: 28 May 1853; Stockholm, Sweden
- Died: 22 January 1919 (aged 65); Falun, Sweden
- Education: Royal Swedish Academy of Arts
- Known for: Painting; writing
- Spouse: Karin Larsson

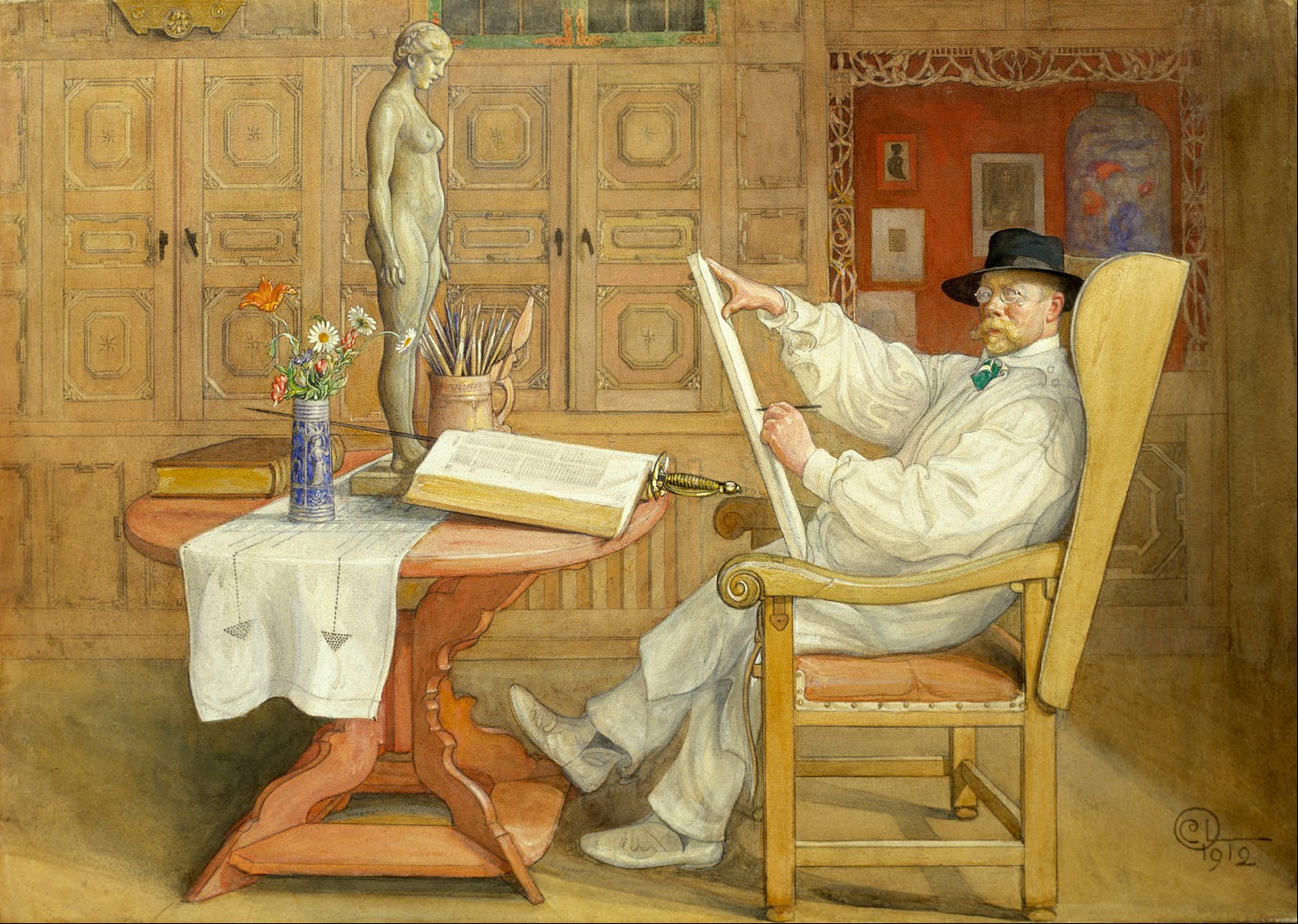
Self-Portrait in the new studio

Carl Olof Larsson (Swedish pronunciation: [ˈkɑːɭ ˈlɑ̌ːʂɔn]; 28 May 1853 – 22 January 1919) was a Swedish painter representative of the Arts and Crafts movement. His many paintings include oils, watercolors, and frescoes. He is principally known for his watercolors of idyllic family life. He considered his finest work to be Midvinterblot (Midwinter Sacrifice), a large painting now displayed inside the Swedish National Museum of Fine Arts.

== Biography ==
=== Early life and education ===
Larsson was born on 28 May 1853, in the Gamla stan neighborhood of Stockholm, Sweden. His parents were extremely poor, and his childhood was not happy.

Renate Puvogel, in her book Carl Larsson (Cologne: Taschen; 1994), gives detailed information about Larsson's life: "His mother was thrown out of the house, together with Carl and his brother Johan; after enduring a series of temporary dwellings, the family moved into Grev Magnigränd No. 7 (later No. 5) in what was then Ladugårdsplan, present-day Östermalm".

Larsson's father worked as a casual laborer, sailed as a stoker on a ship headed for Scandinavia, and lost the lease to a nearby mill, only to work there later as a mere grain carrier. Larsson portrays him as a loveless man lacking self-control; he drank, ranted and raved, and incurred the lifelong anger of his son after an outburst in which he declared, "I curse the day you were born". In contrast, Carl's mother worked long hours as a laundress to provide for her family.

However, at the age of thirteen, his teacher at the school for poor children urged him to apply to the Royal Swedish Academy of Arts, and he was admitted. During his first years there, Larsson felt socially inferior, confused, and shy. In 1869, at the age of sixteen, he was promoted to the "antique school" of the same academy. There Larsson gained confidence, and even became a central figure in student life. Carl earned his first medal in nude drawing. In the meantime, Larsson worked as a caricaturist for the humorous paper Kasper and as a graphic artist for the newspaper Ny Illustrerad Tidning. His annual wages were sufficient to allow him to help support his parents financially.

=== Career ===
After several years working as an illustrator of books, magazines, and newspapers, Larsson moved to Paris in 1877, where he spent several frustrating years as a hardworking artist without any success. Larsson was not eager to establish contact with the French progressive Impressionists; instead, along with other Swedish artists, he cut himself off from the radical movement of change.

After spending two summers in Barbizon, the refuge of the plein-air painters, in 1882 he settled for a time with his Swedish painter colleagues in Grez-sur-Loing at a Scandinavian artists' colony outside Paris. It was there that he met the artist Karin Bergöö, who he married in 1883. This was to be a turning point in Larsson's life. In Grez, Larsson painted some of his most important works, now in watercolour and very different from the oil painting technique he had previously employed.

In 1885 he returned to Sweden where he would stay until 1888, painting scenes of southern Stockholm in en plein air studies. In 1886, he accepted the position of director at the Valand School of Fine Art in Gothenburg, a role he held until 1891. There he taught, among others, Ester Almqvist, to whom he dedicated an etching.

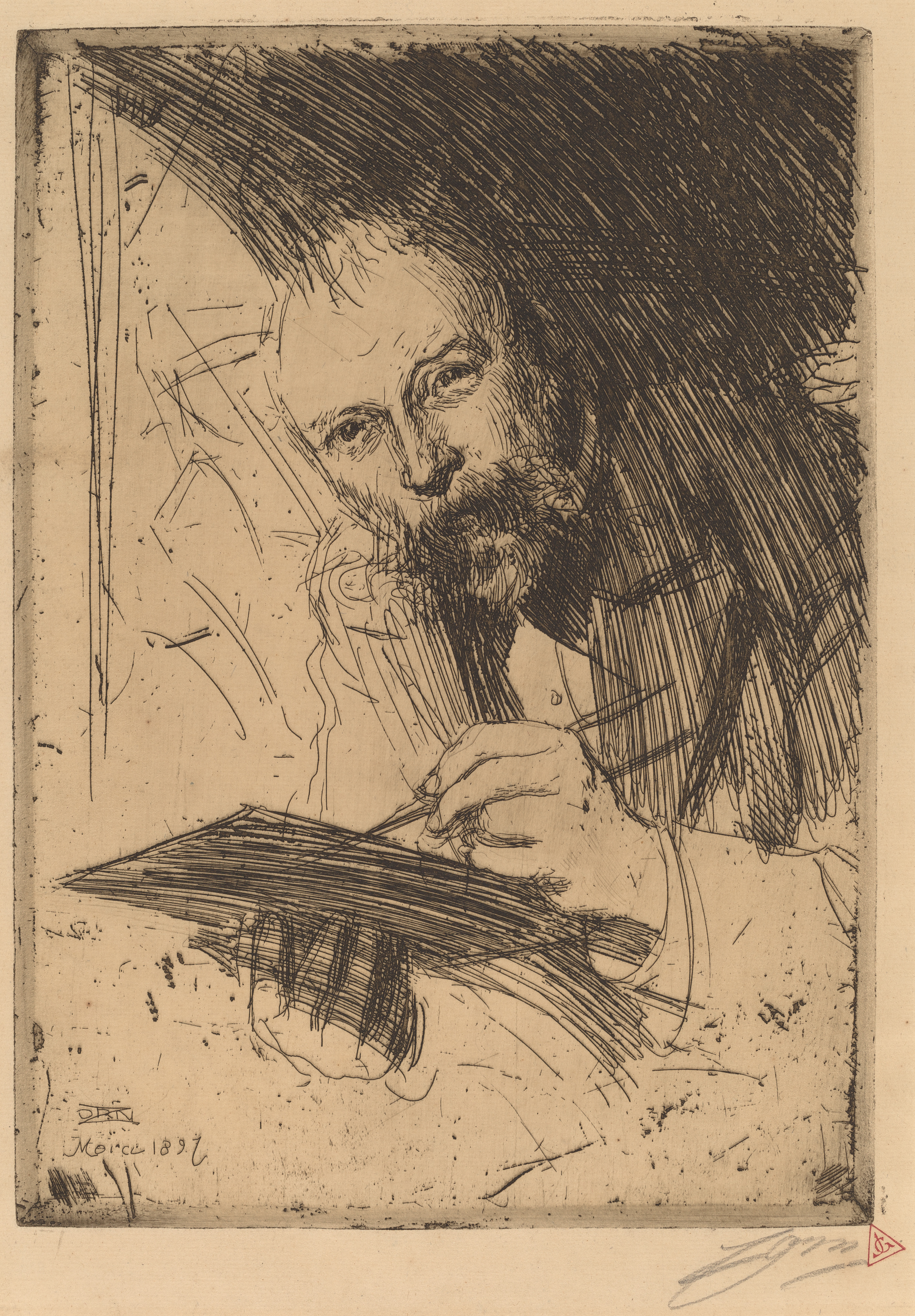
Anders Zorn, Carl Larsson, 1897

His family became Larsson's favourite models. Carl and Karin Larsson together had eight children: Suzanne (b. 1884), Ulf (b. 1887), Pontus (b. 1888), Lisbeth (b. 1891), Brita (b. 1893), Mats (b. 1894), Kersti (b. 1896) and Esbjörn (b. 1900). Many of the interiors he depicted were the work of Karin Larsson, who also worked as an interior designer.

In 1888, the young family was given a small house named Lilla Hyttnäs at Sundborn just outside Falun in Dalarna by Karin's father Adolf Bergöö (1828–1890). Carl and Karin decorated and furnished this house according to their particular artistic taste and also for the needs of the growing family. Through his paintings and books, Little Hyttnäs has become one of the most famous artist's homes in the world, transmitting the artistic taste of its creators and making it a major line in Swedish interior design. The descendants of Carl and Karin Larsson now own this house, now known as Carl Larsson-gården, and keep it open for tourists each summer from May until October.

In his later years he suffered from bouts of depression. While working on Midvinterblot (1915), a large decoration for the vestibule of the Nationalmuseum, Larsson experienced the onset of an eye problem and a worsening of his frequent headaches. After suffering a mild stroke in January 1919, he spent his remaining time completing his memoirs. He died later that month in Falun and was buried in the cemetery of Sundborn Church.

== Paintings ==
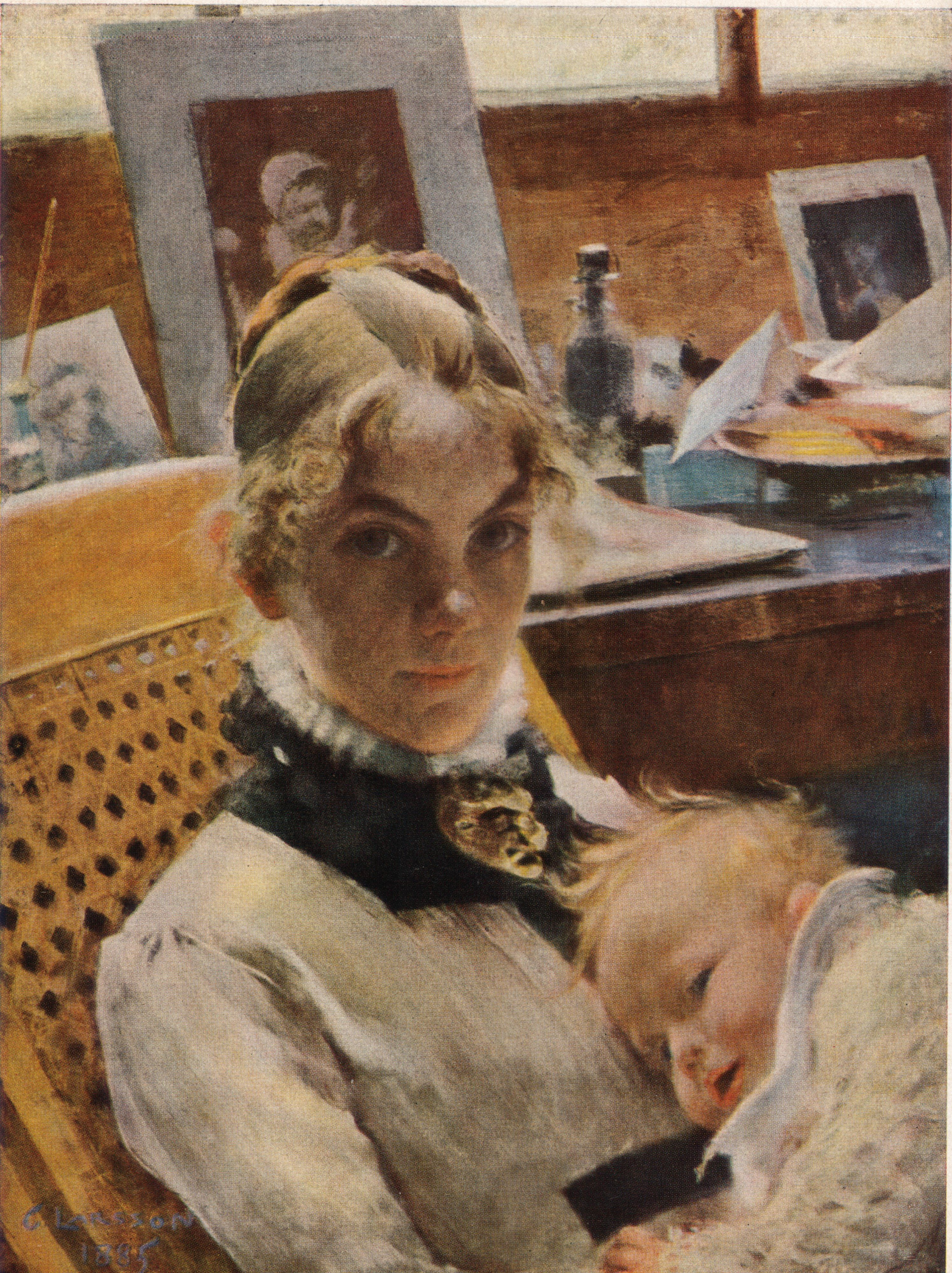
A studio idyll depicting the artist's wife with their first child, Suzanne

Larsson's popularity increased considerably with the development of colour reproduction technology in the 1890s, when the Swedish publisher Bonnier published books written and illustrated by Larsson and containing full colour reproductions of his watercolours, titled A Home. However, the print runs of these rather expensive albums did not come close to that produced in 1909 by the German publisher Karl Robert Langewiesche (1874–1931). Langewiesche's choice of watercolours, drawings and text by Carl Larsson, titled Das Haus in der Sonne (Königstein, Verlag Karl Robert Langewiesche. 1909), immediately became one of the German publishing industry's best-sellers of the year—40,000 copies sold in three months, and more than 40 print runs have been produced up to 2001. Carl and Karin Larsson declared themselves overwhelmed by such success.

Carl Larsson considered his monumental works, such as his frescos in schools, museums and other public buildings, to be his most important works. His last monumental work, Midvinterblot (Midwinter Sacrifice), a 6-by-14-metre (20 ft × 46 ft) oil painting completed in 1915, had been commissioned for a wall in the National Museum in Stockholm (which already had several of his frescos adorning its walls). However, upon completion, it was rejected by the board of the museum. The fresco depicts the blót of King Domalde at the Temple of Uppsala. Decades later, the painting was purchased and placed in the National Museum.

=== Gallery ===
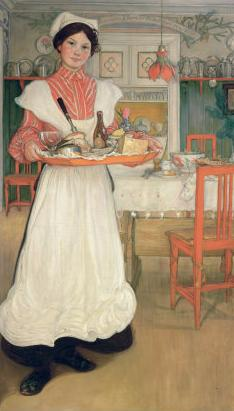
Martina with the breakfast tray, watercolor, 1904

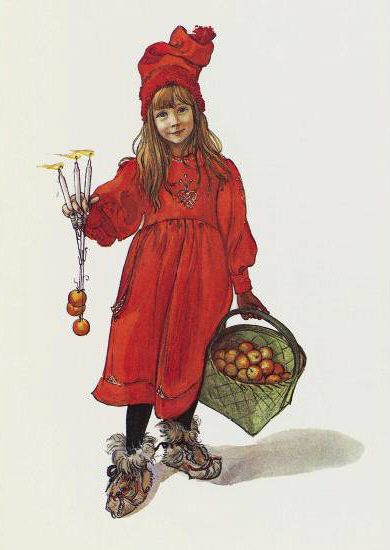
Brita as Iduna, lithograph, 1901

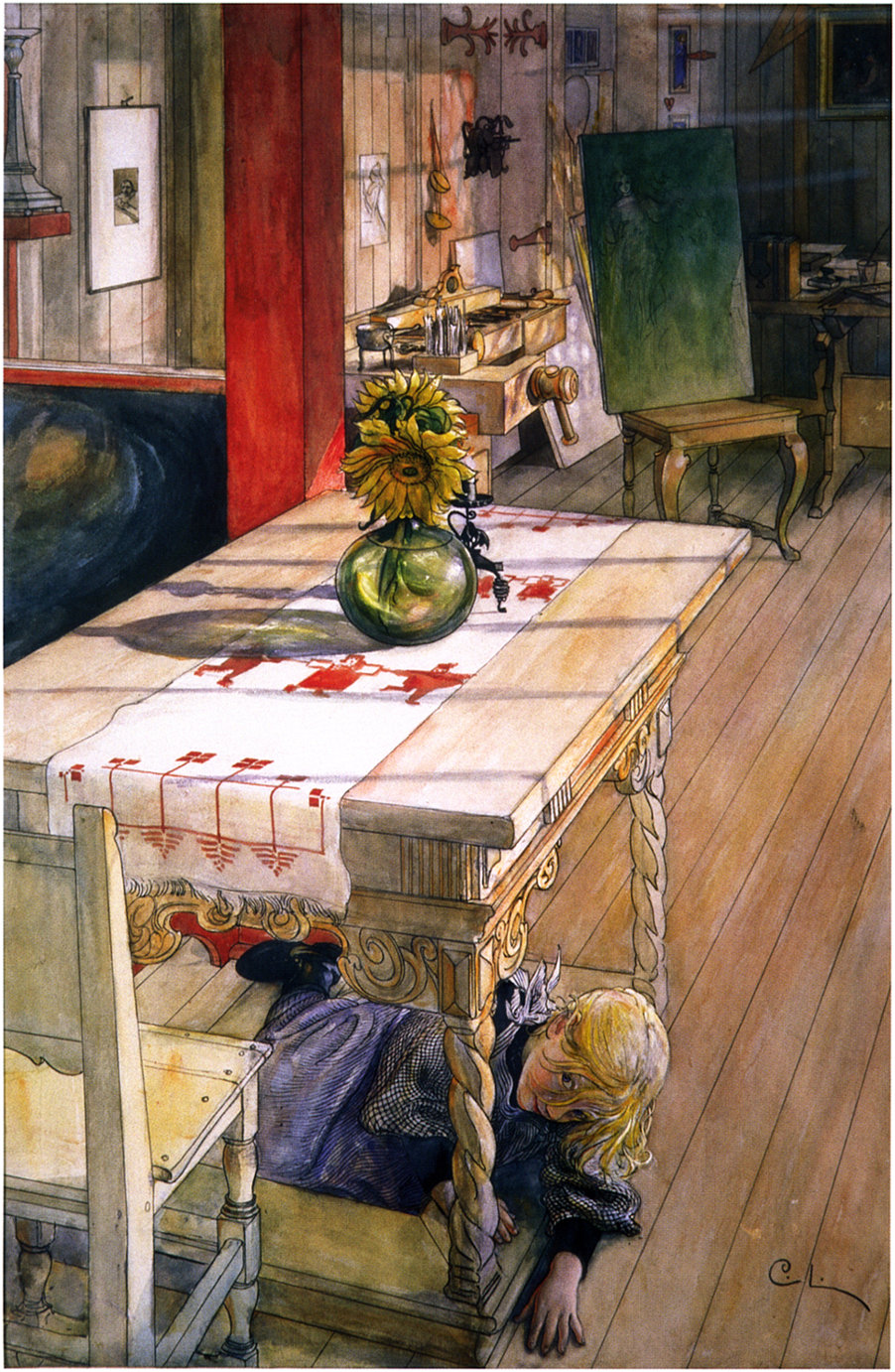
Hide and Seek, 1898

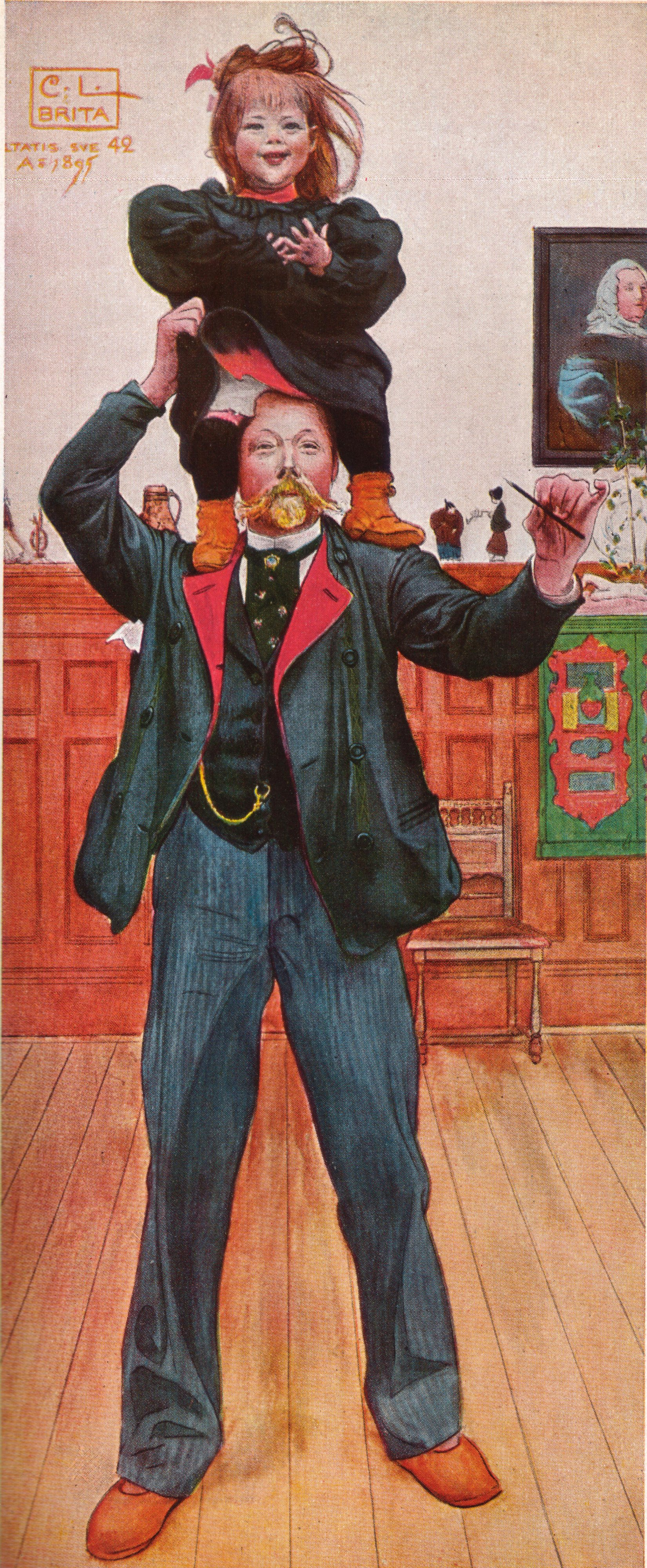
Self-portrait with Brita, watercolor, 1895

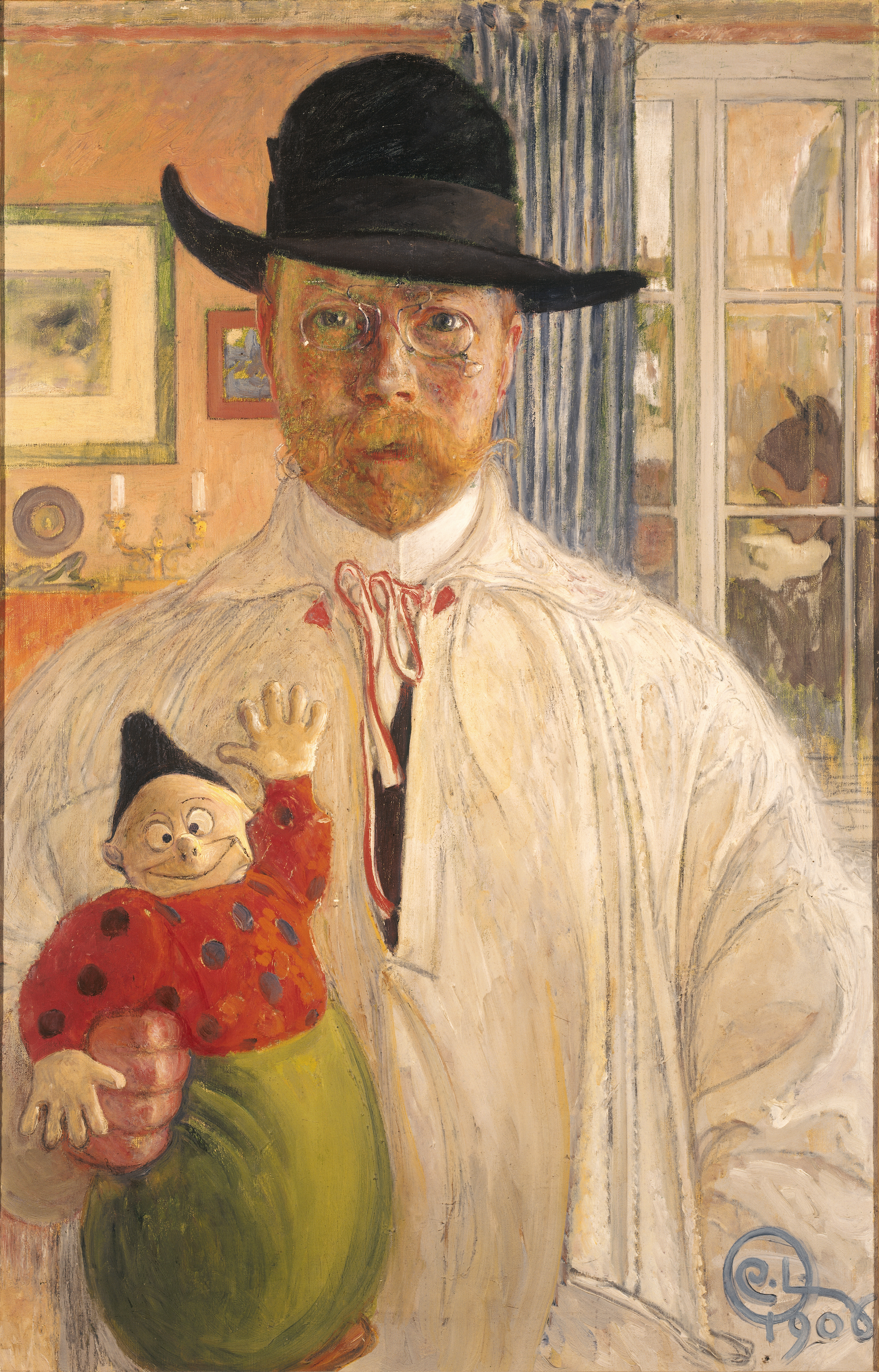
Self-portrait, oil on canvas, 1906
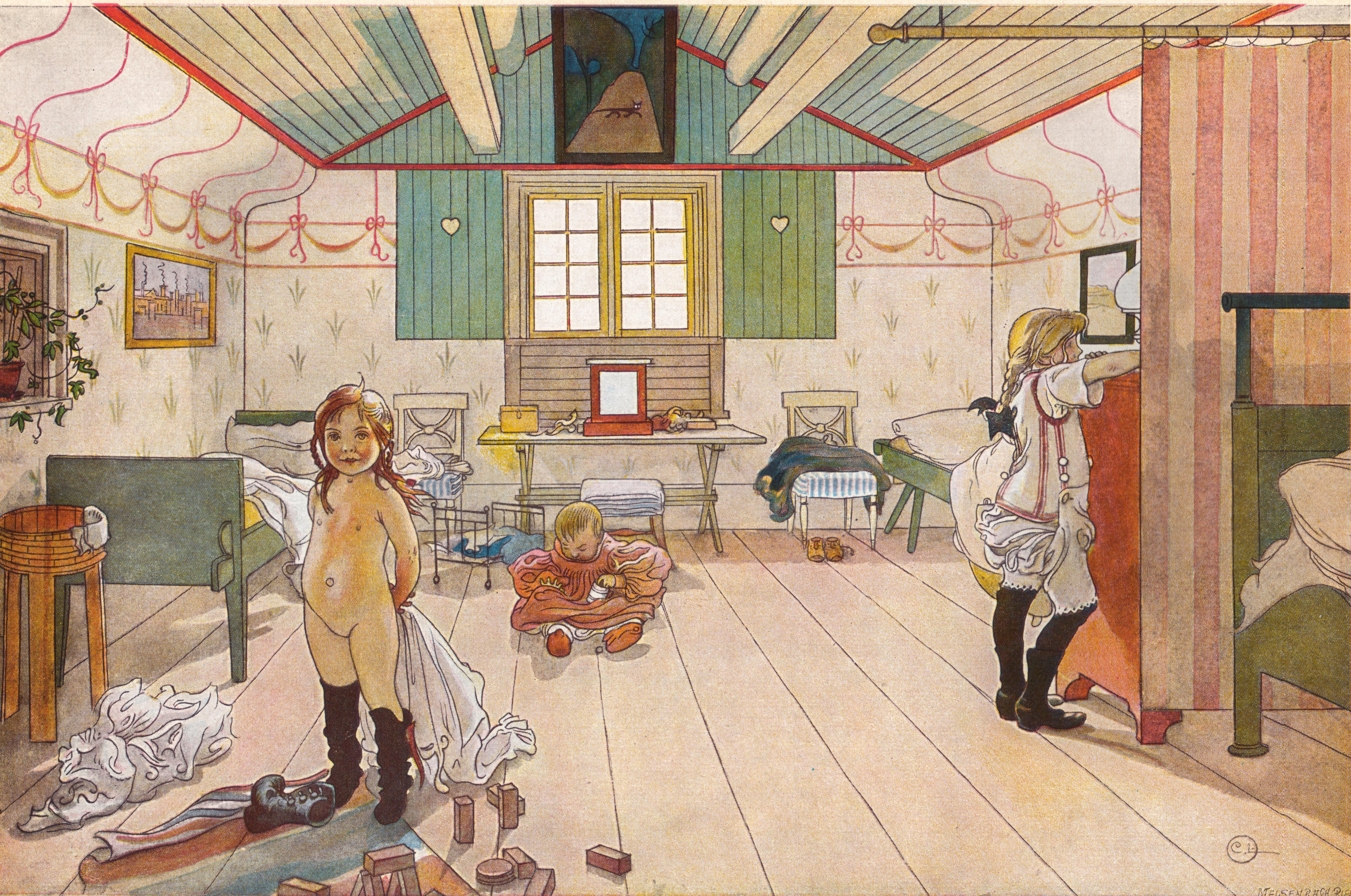
Mamma's and the small girls' room, watercolor, 1897

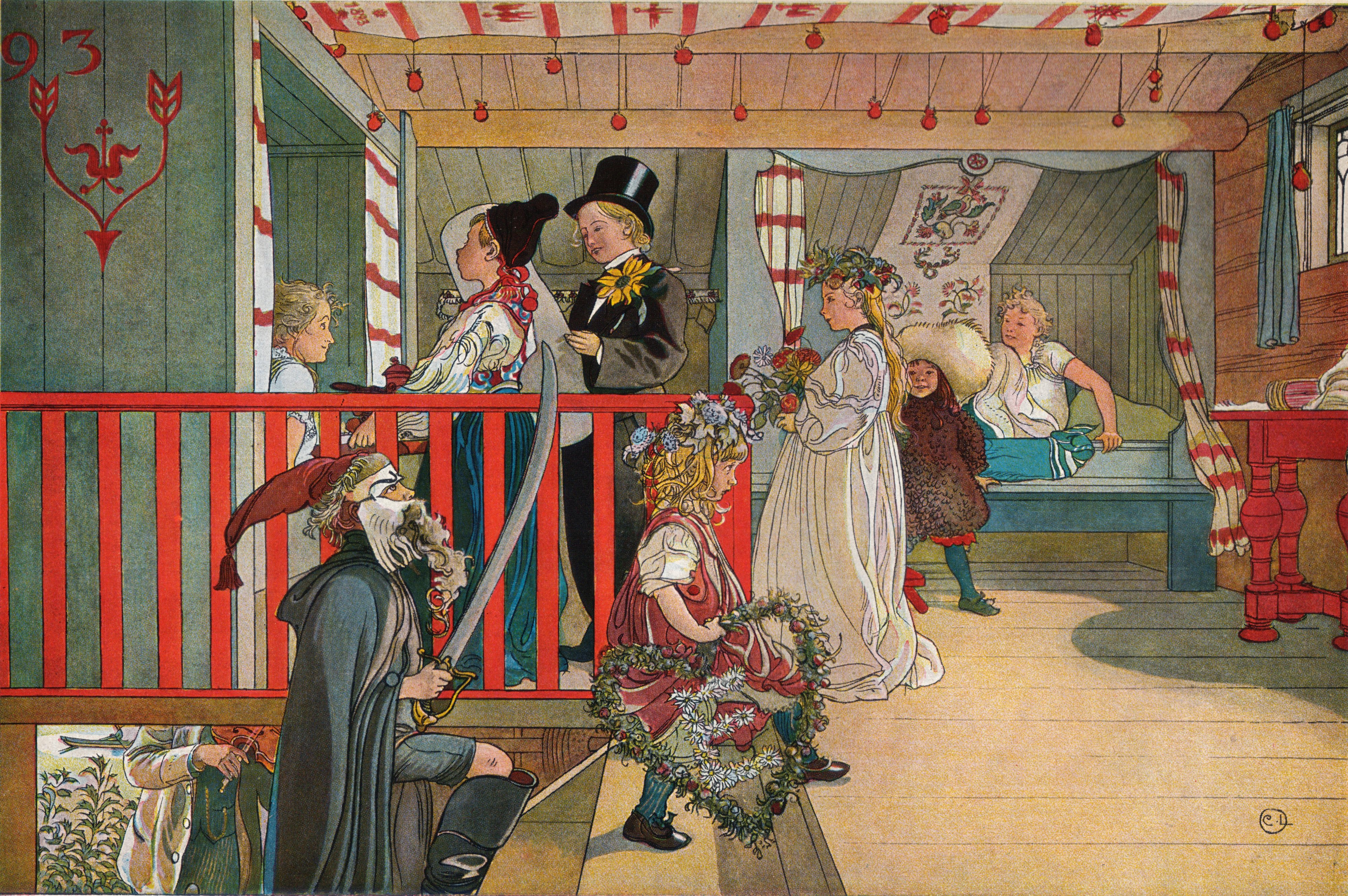
Nameday at the storage house, watercolor, 1897

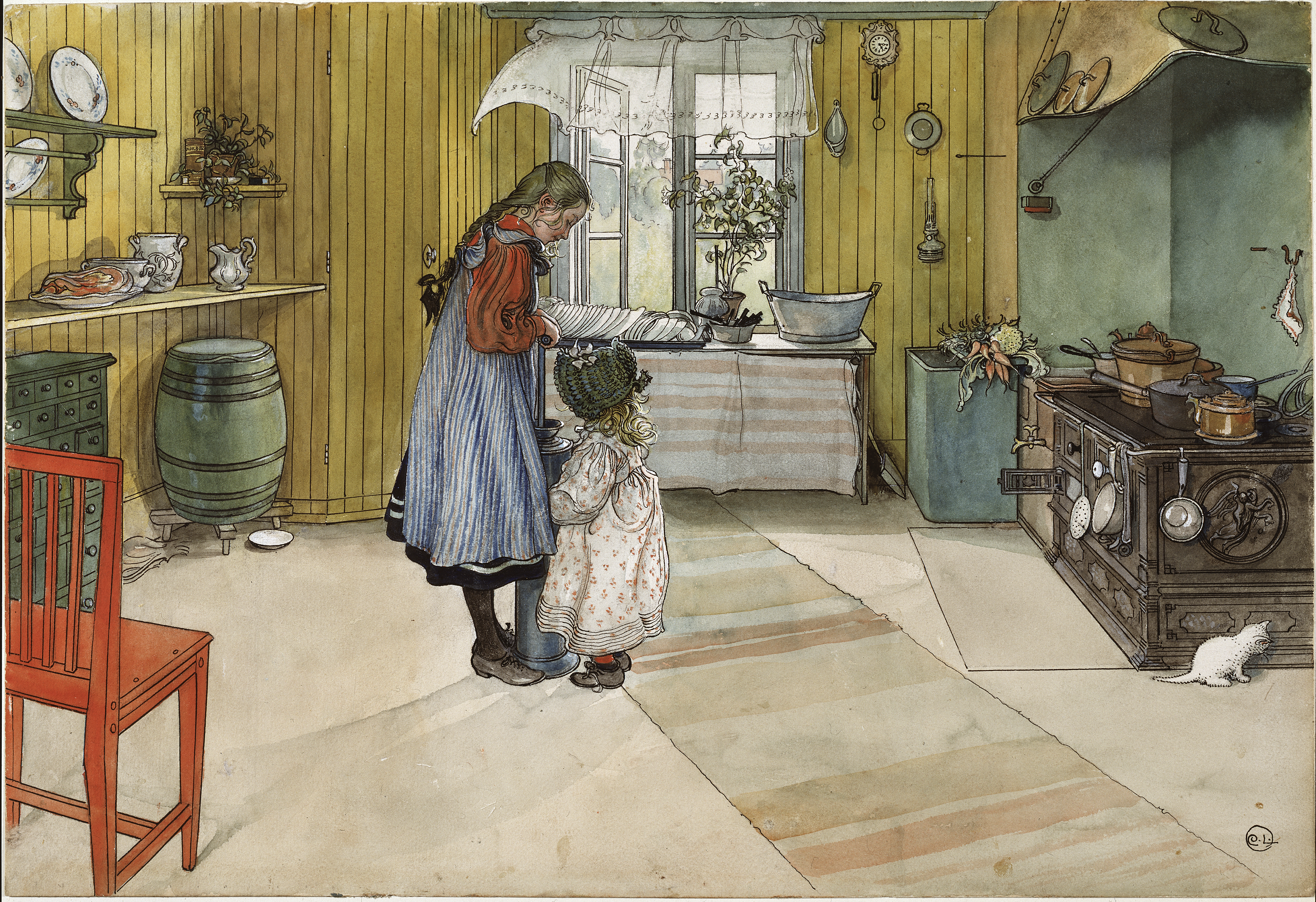
The kitchen, watercolor, c. 1898

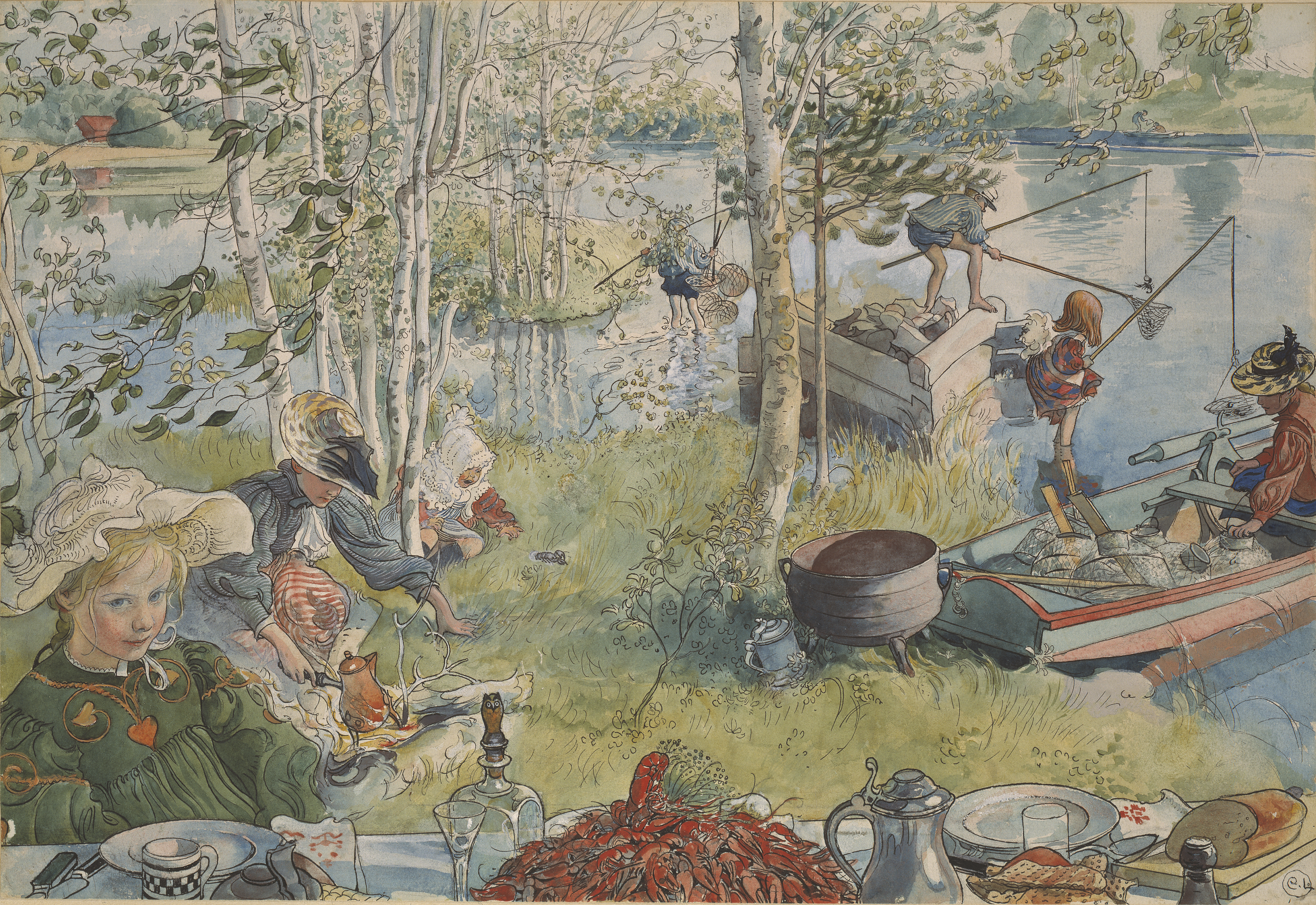
Crayfishing, watercolor, c. 1898

Azalea, 1906

== Bibliography ==
- 1895: De mina. (My Loved Ones) ISBN 91-0-048339-7
- 1899: Ett hem (A Home) ISBN 0-399-20400-8 and ISBN 0-86315-549-9
- 1902: Larssons (The Larssons) ISBN 91-85500-22-4
- 1906: Spadarfvet – mitt lilla lantbruk (A Farm) ISBN 0-399-20541-1
- 1910: Åt solsidan (On the Sunny Side) (ISBN 91-85500-24-0 and ISBN 1-870180-01-1
- 1913: Andras barn (Other People's Children) ISBN 91-49-04335-8
- 1931: Jag (I, Carl Larsson) (autobiography) ISBN 978-91-7250-158-4

== See also ==
- Anders Zorn
