= Karl Robert Langewiesche =

Karl Robert Langewiesche (18 December 1874 in Rheydt – 12 September 1931 in Königstein im Taunus) was a German publisher. In 1902 he founded the Verlag Langewiesche in Düsseldorf, one of the oldest book publishers in Germany still operating.

Son of a bookseller, Langewiesche founded his publishing company on 5 May 1902 with the goal to produce "distinguished mass-produced articles at the lowest prices" in order to make them available, "especially to the broad masses: those who are called uneducated, who may become so through my work." The concept proved successful, largely through Langewiesche's advanced marketing methods. He is regarded as the inventor of the publisher-issued shop window poster and for the blurb (German: Klappentext).

His first books were dedicated to lifestyle and world views. In 1907 he created a series of art and photo books creating a new genre of such high-class books produced inexpensively. From 1909 on he used the trademark, "The Blue Book" because his books had been printed with blue dust jackets since 1902. The use of advertising texts on the dust jacket was a first in the industry.

He married Stefanie Rampelmann (1878-1956), a graphic design student in Stuttgart and Düsseldorf, in 1909. The couple had no children.

In 1913 the publishing firm relocated to the spa town Königstein im Taunus. For the firm's 25th anniversary, he founded, under the motto "Good for All" an even cheaper label, "The Iron Hammer" (renamed in 1949 as the Langewiesche Library) with red covers.

After his death in 1931, the firm was inherited by his widow, who was assisted by Hans Köster (1902-1996). He had worked for the firm since 1927.

His elder brother, Wilhelm Langewiesche (1866-1934) also founded a publishing company in 1906 under the name of Langewiesche-Brandt.
