= 1912 in art =

Events from the year 1912 in art.

== Events ==
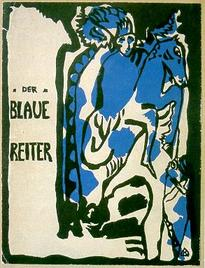
Cover of Der Blaue Reiter Almanac

- January 5 (Old Style December 23, 1911) – Moscow Art Theatre production of Hamlet, designed by Edward Gordon Craig, opens.
- April – Egon Schiele is arrested in Neulengbach for seducing and abducting a minor; these charges are dropped but he is imprisoned for 21 days for exhibiting erotic drawings in a place accessible to children (his studio). One of the drawings in burned in court. He paints while imprisoned.
- May – The Blue Rider Almanac published in Munich, containing reproductions of more than 140 multi-ethnic artworks, articles on the visual arts and music and Vasilly Kandinsky's experimental theater composition The Yellow Sound.
- June 26 – Austrian writer Frida Strindberg opens The Cave of the Golden Calf, a London nightclub decorated by Spencer Gore, Wyndham Lewis, Charles Ginner and Jacob Epstein with its motif by Eric Gill; it becomes a haunt of Futurists.
- July – At the 1912 Summer Olympics in Stockholm, American marksman, horse breeder and artist Walter W. Winans wins a silver medal for shooting and a gold in the sculpture category of the art competitions for his bronze statuette An American Trotter.
- December 24 – William Zorach marries Marguerite Thompson.
- In Paris, Albert Gleizes and Jean Metzinger publish the first major treatise on Cubism, Du "Cubisme", followed by André Salmon's La jeune peinture française including Histoire anecdotique du cubisme.
- French poet Guillaume Apollinaire introduces the term 'Orphism', in an address at the Salon de la Section d'Or, referring initially to the 'pure painting' of František Kupka.
- Ludwig Meidner begins producing his "Apocalyptic Landscapes".

== Exhibitions ==
- March – Exhibition of Italian Futurism transfers from Paris to the Sackville Gallery in London, organised by Robert René Meyer-Sée.
- May 25–September 30 – Third International Art Exhibition organized by Sonderbund westdeutscher Kunstfreunde und Künstler, in Cologne (Ausstellungshalle der Stadt Cöln am Aachener Tor), featuring works by Vincent van Gogh, Paul Cézanne, Paul Gauguin, Pablo Picasso, Henri-Edmond Cross, Paul Signac and Edvard Munch.
- Second Post-Impressionist Exhibition organized by Roger Fry in London.
- René Lalique and Maurice Marinot independently stage the first exhibitions of their glasswares.

== Works ==
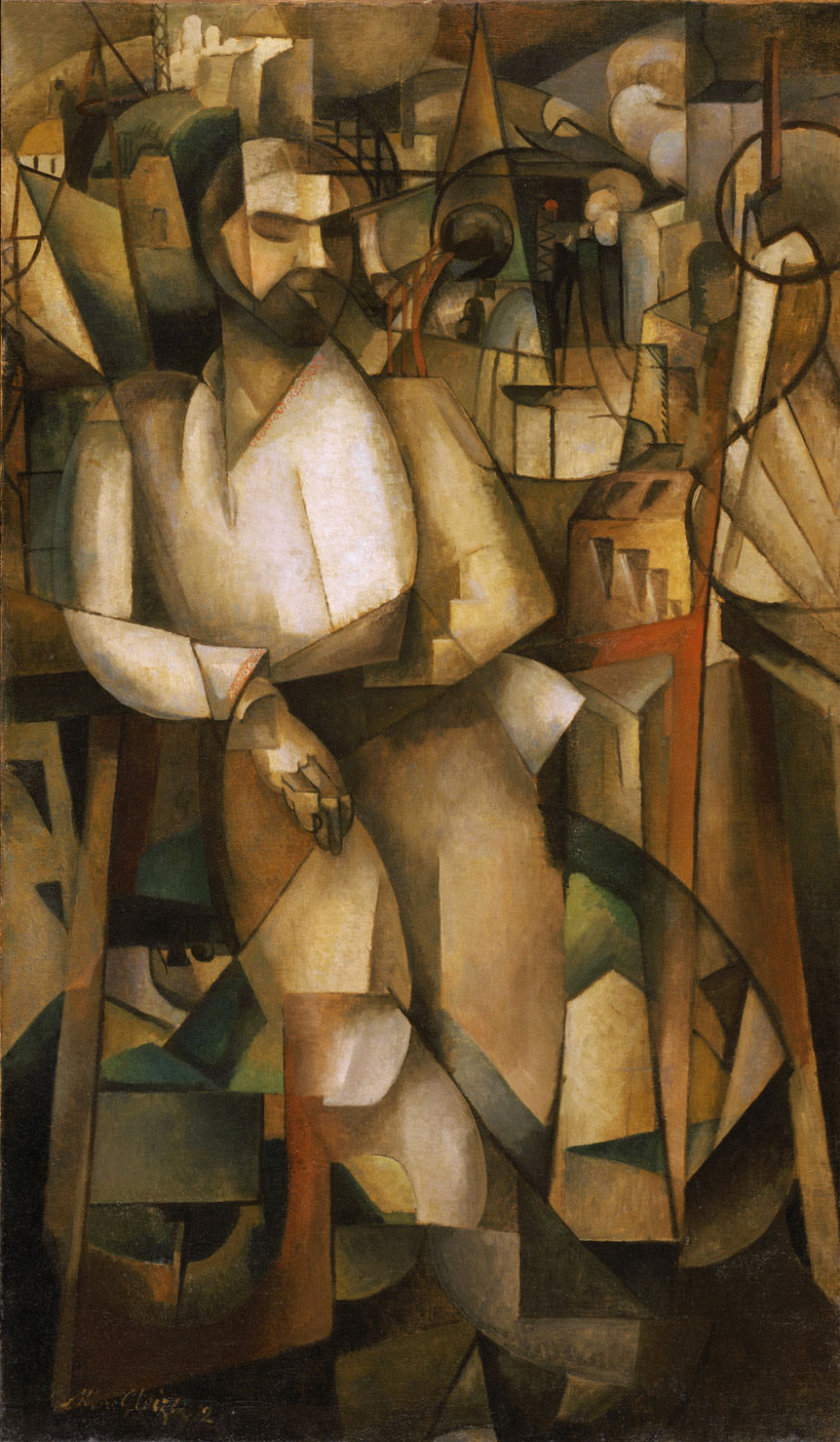
Albert Gleizes, 1912, l'Homme au Balcon, Man on a Balcony (Portrait of Dr. Théo Morinaud), oil on canvas, 195.6 x 114.9 cm (77 x 45 1/4 in.), Philadelphia Museum of Art. Completed the same year that the painter co-authors the book Du "Cubisme" with Jean Metzinger. Exhibited at Salon d'Automne, Paris, 1912, Armory Show, New York, Chicago, Boston, 1913

Letchworth Station by Spencer Gore

Portrait of Marie Clothilde Guinness by Frank Dicksee

- Giacomo Balla
  - Dynamism of a Dog on a Leash
  - Girl Running on a Balcony
  - The Hand of the Violinist
- Vanessa Bell – Portrait of Virginia Woolf
- George Bellows – Men of the Docks
- David Bomberg – Vision of Ezekiel
- Pierre Bonnard – St Tropez, Pier
- Georges Braque
  - Fruit Dish and Glass
  - The Guitar
- Richard E. Brooks – Statue of John McGraw (bronze sculpture, Seattle)
- Paul Émile Chabas – September Morn (Metropolitan Museum of Art)
- Jerome Connor – Bishop John Carroll (bronze sculpture, Washington, D.C.)
- John Currie – Some Later Primitives and Madame Tisceron
- Roger de La Fresnaye – Mon Ami, Jean Cocteau
- Robert Delaunay – Windows (series)
- Frank Dicksee – Portrait of Marie Clothilde Guinness
- Marcel Duchamp – Nude Descending a Staircase, No. 2
- Rogelio de Egusquiza – Tristan and Isolde (Life)
- Lydia Field Emmet – Self Portrait
- Jacob Epstein – Tomb of Oscar Wilde (Père Lachaise Cemetery, Paris)
- E. Phillips Fox – Nasturtiums
- Roger Fry
  - Portrait of Edith Sitwell
  - River with Poplars (approximate date)
- Laura Gilpin – Basket of Peaches (color photograph)
- Charles Ginner – Piccadilly Circus
- Albert Gleizes
  - The Bathers
  - Football Players
  - Harvest Threshing
  - Man on a Balcony
  - Passy, Bridges of Paris
- J. W. Godward
  - Absence Makes The Heart Grow Fonder
  - By The Wayside
  - An Offering To Venus
  - The Peacock Fan
- Spencer Gore – Letchworth Station
- Juan Gris – Verre et Bouteilles (Glass and Bottles)
- Vilhelm Hammershøi – Interior with an Easel, Bredgade 25
- Ernst Ludwig Kirchner
  - Nollendorfplatz
  - Das Urteil des Paris ("The Judgment of Paris")
  - Vier Holzplastiken ("Four Wooden Sculptures" - painting of nude figures, Dallas Museum of Art)
- Gustav Klimt – Portrait of Adele Bloch-Bauer II
- František Kupka – The Cathedral (Katedrála)
- Boris Kustodiev
  - Easter Greetings
  - Self-portrait
- Fernand Léger
  - La Fumée (Smoke)
  - Woman in Blue
- Wyndham Lewis – Smiling Woman Ascending a Stair
- Kazimir Malevich – The Knifegrinder
- J. B. Manson – Approximate date
  - Self-portrait
  - Still Life: Tulips in a Blue Jug
- Franz Marc
  - Atonement (woodcut)
  - Deer in the Woods II
  - The Dream
  - Horses Resting (colored woodcut, 1911–12)
  - In the Rain
  - Legend of the Animals (woodcut)
  - The Little Monkey
  - Little Blue Horse
  - Red Bull (gouache)
  - Sleeping Shepherdess (woodcut)
  - Tiger
- Henri Matisse
  - Arab Coffeehouse
  - The Conversation
  - Goldfish
  - The Little Mulatta
  - Palm Tree Leaf Tangier
  - Paysage marocain (Acanthes)
  - Seated Riffian
  - View over the Bay of Tangier
  - Window at Tangier
  - Zorah on the Terrace
- Jean Metzinger
  - The Blue Bird
  - Dancer in a café
  - Man with a Pipe
  - Nature morte
  - La Plume Jaune (The Yellow Feather) I and II
  - Au Vélodrome
  - Woman with a horse
  - Woman with a Fan
- Amedeo Modigliani – Tête (sculpture)
- Piet Mondrian – Gray Tree
- Mikhail Nesterov – Crucifixion
- C.R.W. Nevinson – The Towpath
- Emil Nolde
  - The Life of Christ (polyptych)
  - The Prophet (woodcut)
- William Orpen – Portrait of Gardenia St. George With Riding Crop
- Francis Picabia
  - The Procession, Seville
  - The Spring
- Pablo Picasso
  - Bottle, Glass, Fork
  - Guitar (paperboard assemblage)
  - Ma Jolie
  - Still Life with Chair Caning
  - Violon et raisins
  - Violon, verre, pipe et encrier
- Charles A. Platt – Josephine Shaw Lowell Memorial Fountain (New York City)
- J. Massey Rhind – George Washington (bronze equestrian sculpture, Newark)
- Franz Roubaud – Battle of Borodino Panorama
- Egon Schiele
  - Portrait of Wally
  - Self-portrait with Chinese lantern fruits
- Kathleen Scott – Charles Stewart Rolls (bronze sculpture, Dover)
- T. F. Simon – Second Hand Booksellers, Spring
- Max Slevogt – The Singer Francisco D'Andrade as Don Giovanni in Mozart's Opera ("The Red d'Andrade")
- Stanley Spencer – The Nativity
- James Wehn – Statue of Chief Seattle (copper sculpture, Seattle)
- Christopher Whall and Mabel Esplin – Lady chapel windows, St John the Divine, Richmond, London
- William Barnes Wollen – The Battle of Albuera

== Births ==
=== January to June ===
- January 7 – Charles Addams, American cartoonist (d.1988)
- January 28 – Jackson Pollock, American painter (d.1956)
- January 29 – Constantin Kluge, Russian and French painter (d.2003)
- February 7 – Russell Drysdale, Australian artist (d.1981)
- March 4 – Afro Basaldella, Italian painter (d.1976)
- March 22 – Agnes Martin, Canadian-US painter (d.2004)
- April 14 – Robert Doisneau, French photographer (d.1994)
- April 21 – Eve Arnold, née Cohen, American photographer (d.2012)
- May 8 – John Deakin, English photographer (d.1972)
- June 4 – Robert Jacobsen, Danish sculptor and painter (d.1993)
- June 8 – Harry Holtzman, American artist (died 1987)
- June 11 – William Baziotes, American painter (d.1963)

=== July to December ===
- July 10 – Isabel Nicholas, English painter and model (d.1992)
- August 1 – Rachel Baes, Belgian painter (d.1983)
- August 23 – Keith Vaughan, English painter (d.1977)
- August 29 – Wolfgang Suschitzky, Austrian-born documentary photographer and cinematographer (d.2016)
- September 4
  - Syd Hoff, US children's book author and cartoonist (d.2004)
  - Alexander Liberman, Russian-born painter and sculptor (d.1999)
- September 5
  - Kristina Söderbaum, Swedish-German film actress, producer and photographer (d.2001)
  - Frank Thomas, US animator (d.2004)
- September 15 – Antonio Blanco, Filipino painter (d.1999)
- September 23 – Tony Smith, US sculptor, visual artist and theorist on art (d.1980)
- October 31 – Ollie Johnston, US animator (d.2008)
- November 3 – Ida Kohlmeyer, US painter and sculptor (d.1997)
- November 28 – Morris Louis, US painter (d.1962)
- December 27 – Conroy Maddox, English surrealist painter, collagist, writer and lecturer (d.2005)

== Deaths ==
- January 18 – Hermann Kern, Austrian painter (born 1838)
- February 3 – Joan Brull, Catalan Symbolist painter (born 1863)
- February 14 – Mathurin Moreau, French sculptor (born 1822)
- March 16 – Elizabeth Forbes, Canadian painter of the Newlyn School (born 1859; cancer)
- March 29 – John Gerrard Keulemans, Dutch bird illustrator (born 1842)
- March 31 – Robert Loftin Newman, American painter and stained-glass designer (born 1827; asphyxiation)
- April 15 – Francis Davis Millet, American painter, sculptor and writer (born 1846) (died on board the Titanic)
- May 2 – Homer Davenport, American cartoonist (born 1867)
- May 20 – Louis Hasselriis, Danish sculptor known for public monuments (born 1844)
- June 25 – Lawrence Alma-Tadema, Dutch painter (born 1836)
- June 30 – John Ford Paterson, Scottish–Australian artist, president of the Victorian Artists Society (born 1851)
- July 16 – Thomas Fitzpatrick, Irish cartoonist (born 1860)
- August 20 – Walter Goodman, English painter, illustrator and author (born 1838)
- September 2 – Henry Allan, Irish painter (born 1865)
- September 15 – John Leighton, English book illustrator (born 1822)
- October 11 – Nils Hansteen, Norwegian painter (born 1855)
- November 1 – John Emms, English painter (born 1844)
- November 22 – Otto Lessing, German historicist sculptor (born 1846)
- December 1 – John Moyr Smith, Scottish-born ceramic artist (born 1839)
- December 7 – Tadeusz Żukotyński, Polish count, professor, and painter (born 1855)
- December 8 – Tony Robert-Fleury, French painter (born 1865)
- December 23 – Édouard Detaille, French painter
