= Tristan and Isolde (Egusquiza) =

Paintings by Rogelio de Egusquiza

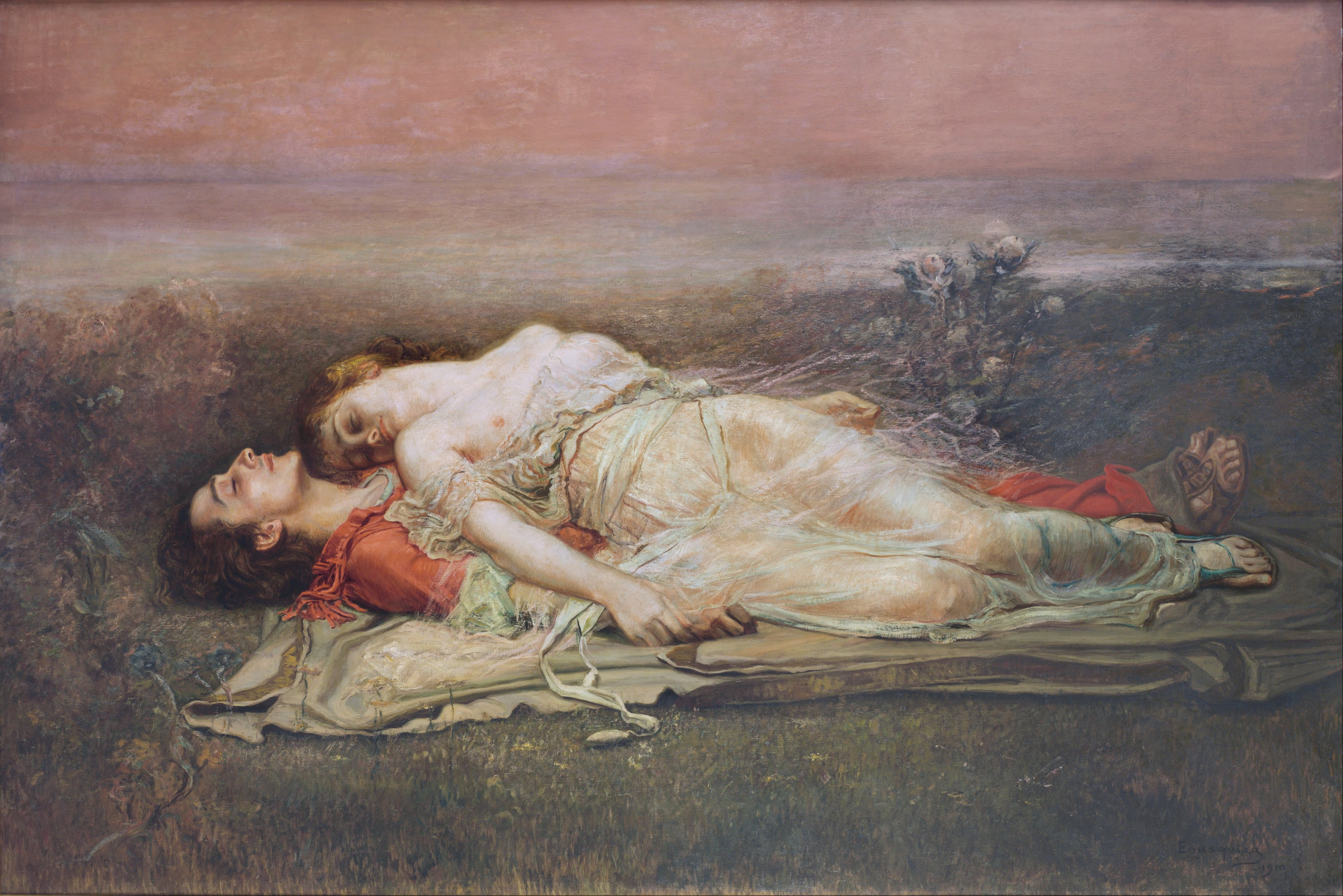
Tristan and Isolde (Death), 1910, 160 by 240 cm (63 by 94 in) (Bilbao Fine Arts Museum)

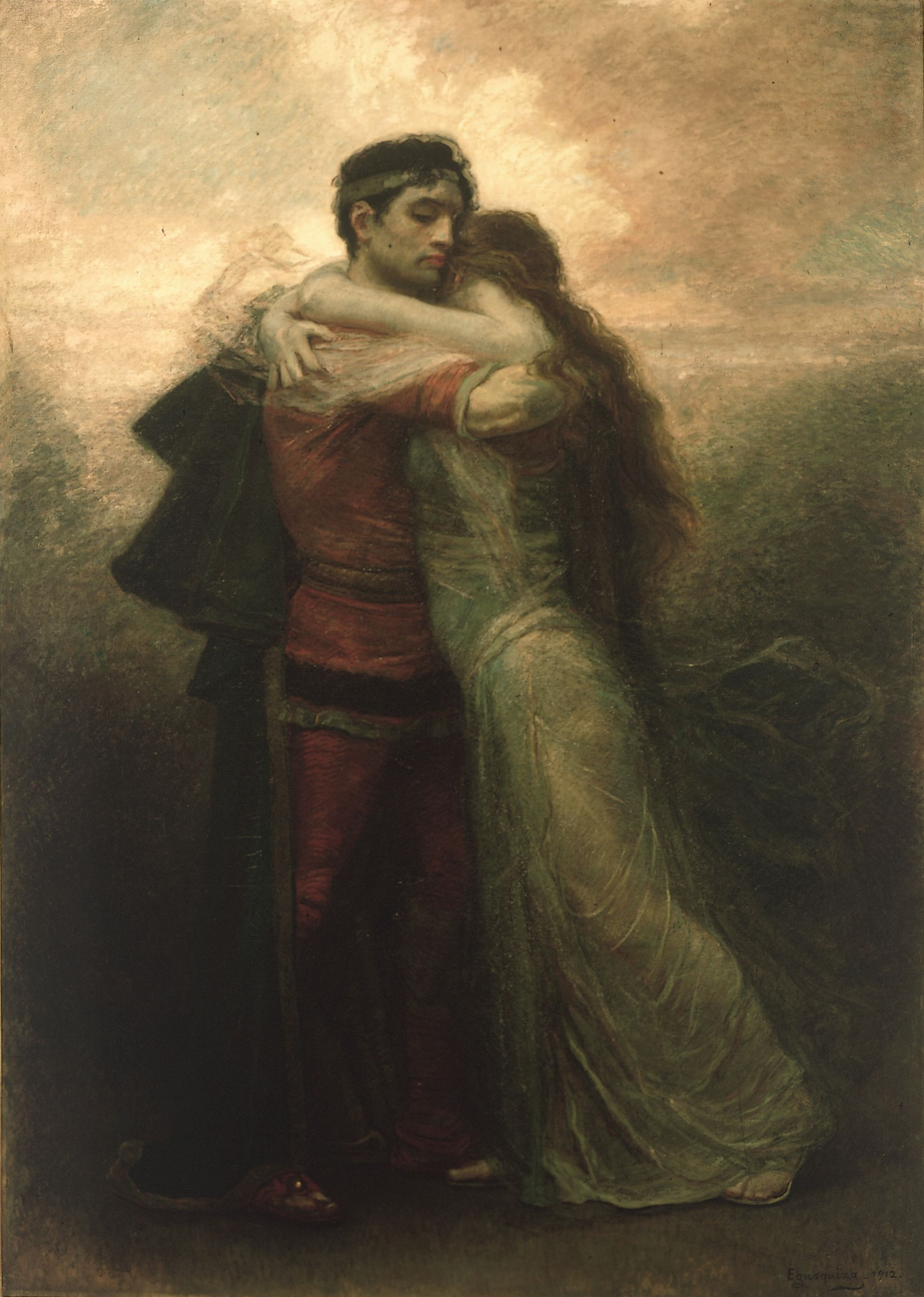
Tristan and Isolde (Life), 1912, 227 by 162 cm (89 by 64 in) (MAS)

Tristan and Isolde (Spanish: Tristán e Isolda) is the title of two oil paintings by the Spanish artist Rogelio de Egusquiza. Both works are based on the opera Tristan und Isolde by the German composer Richard Wagner, whom Egusquiza idolised. The first painting, subtitled Death and also known as La mort d'Isolde (The Death of Isolde), was completed in 1910 and depicts Isolde's "Liebestod", as she collapses in death upon the lifeless body of Tristan. The second painting, subtitled Life, was completed two years later and depicts the lovers embracing in the night, a scene from the second act of Wagner's opera.

The two works are part of a series of paintings by Egusquiza depicting Wagnerian subjects after he developed a fascination for Wagner's music in 1879 and met with the composer several times. From the early 1890s, he worked on various studies and etchings and exhibited some of them at the salons in France, where they were enthusiastically received. Death and Life were exhibited in Paris at the Salon of the Société Nationale des Beaux-Arts in 1911 and 1912, respectively. They received mixed reviews from contemporary French critics who disagreed on whether the paintings met the high standards set by Wagner's acclaimed opera.

== Background ==
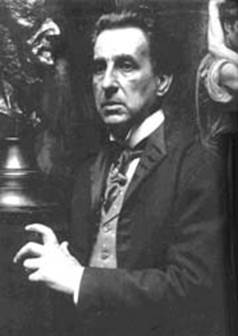
Egusquiza in the 1880s with a bust of Wagner

Born in Santander, Spain, Rogelio de Egusquiza studied in Rome and Paris, including with the French academic painter Léon Bonnat. In his early career, he produced numerous cabinet paintings depicting bourgeois life. His artistic focus shifted dramatically after he attended a performance of Wagner's Der Ring des Nibelungen in 1879 and developed a decades-long fascination with the composer's works. His enthusiasm for what he heard led to several meetings between the two, including a September 1880 meeting in Venice where they discussed Wagner's opera Tristan und Isolde. Egusquiza frequented the annual Bayreuth Festivals in the late 19th and early 20th centuries. He attended the first Bayreuth performances of Parsifal and Tristan und Isolde in 1882 and 1886 respectively, two operas that were later featured prominently in his paintings.

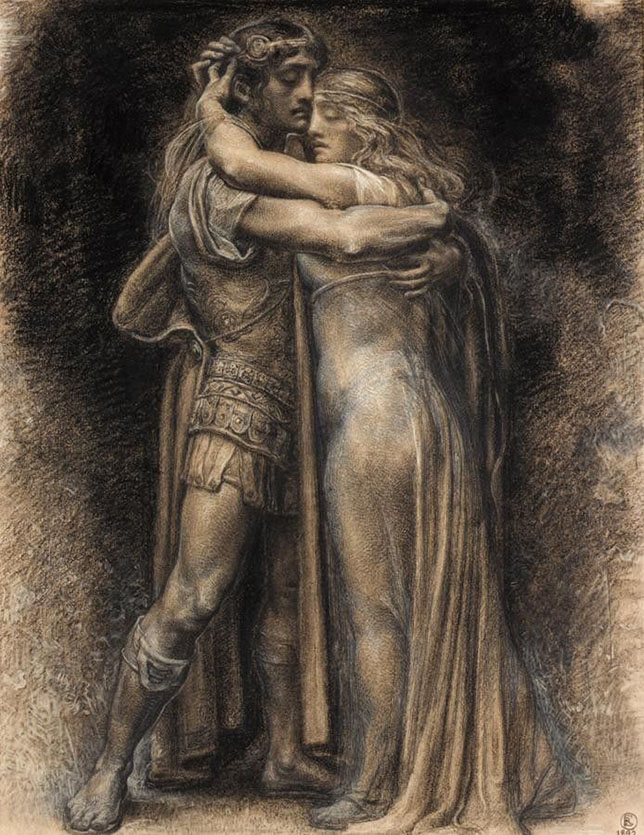
Egusquiza, Siegmund and Sieglinde (1892)

In 1892, he took part in the first Salon de la Rose + Croix hosted by Joséphin Péladan in Paris. Egusquiza's exhibitions included a red chalk drawing of Siegmund and Sieglinde from Die Walküre, and another of Amfortas from Parsifal. Though he had not yet painted Tristan or Isolde, his depiction of Siegmund and Sieglinde's embrace was the precursor to Tristan and Isolde (Life), which it closely resembles. Péladan later alluded to the connection in a description of Egusquiza's Salon paintings, writing: "Ses Tristan sont d'une splendour de vertige indicible" ("His Tristans are of an inexpressibly vertiginous splendour"). In 1896, Egusquiza produced an etching of Tristan and Isolde (Life), changing Siegmund's animal skin clothing into Tristan's knightly attire.

Egusquiza began preparing studies in chalk for the paintings in the early 1890s. He depicted Isolde as nude in the early studies and experimented with both Tristan's and Isolde's positions. An 1899 sketch of Tristan was drawn with Egusquiza's own features, and by 1901 he had established the position of the lovers' bodies in Tristan and Isolde (Death). He exhibited his works, including etchings of Tristan and Isolde, at the salons in France. They received critical acclaim, including from Péladan who wrote that Egusquiza's depictions of Der Ring des Nibelungen and Tristan und Isolde were worthy illustrations of Wagner's music. Egusquiza, however, was dissatisfied with the lack of colour in his own works, an opinion that was shared by Bonnat, his former teacher. He destroyed his early paintings and restarted several times. Tristan and Isolde (Death) was completed in 1910 and exhibited the following year at the Salon of the Société Nationale des Beaux-Arts, where it was presented with the title La mort d'Isolde (The Death of Isolde). Tristan and Isolde (Life) was completed in 1912 and exhibited at the Salon that same year.

== Composition ==
Tristan and Isolde (Death) depicts the lovers during the final scene in the third act of Wagner's opera, as Isolde collapses upon Tristan's body and dies.

Isolde sinkt, wie verklärt, in Brangäne's Armen sanft auf Tristan's Leiche. Grosse Rührung und Entrücktheit unter den Umstehenden. Marke segnet die Leichen. Der Vorhang fällt langsam.

—Tristan und Isolde, Act III, Scene III
Translation:

Isolde sinks, as if transfigured, in Brangäne's arms upon Tristan's body. Profound emotion and grief of the bystanders. Mark invokes a blessing on the dead. Curtain.

—1912 translation published by Dodd, Mead & Co.

The other figures in the scene (Mark, Brangäne, and the bodies of Kurwenal and Melot) are omitted from the painting. The sea is in the background beyond the horizon, consistent with Wagner's stage directions, and surrounding Tristan and Isolde are several types of flowers—a common element in Egusquiza's works.

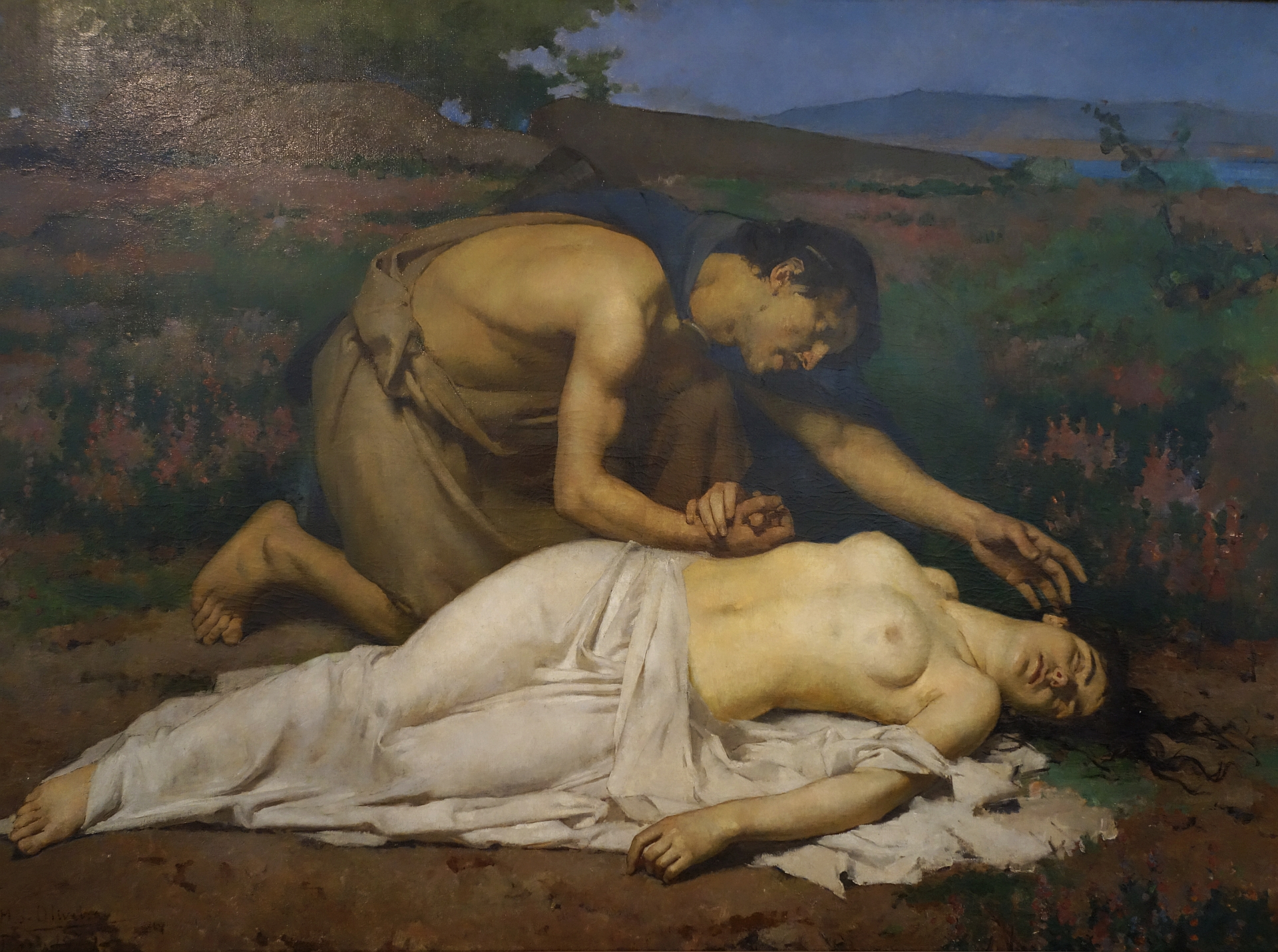
João Marques de Oliveira, Cephalus and Procris (1879) (Soares dos Reis National Museum)

He likely took inspiration from The Two Commanders (1866) by José Casado del Alisal for the placement of Isolde's proper right arm. The work borrows elements from Cephalus and Procris (1879) by João Marques de Oliveira, with similarities in the structure and lighting of the two paintings and common elements such as the landscape and a semi-nude, dead female figure. Egusquiza likely also borrowed from another painting titled Tristan and Isolde (1887) by Jean Delville for his depiction of Isolde's body.

Tristan and Isolde (Life) is based on Act II of the opera, during a scene in which Tristan and Isolde passionately reunite during the night. Wagner used the night as a metaphor for a realm in which the lovers can freely express their desire for each other and for death, in contrast to the daytime when they must hide their love, stifled by honour and shame. Egusquiza, who published a treatise in the Bayreuther Blätter on the use of lighting in Wagner's works in 1885, strove to transcribe the day/night metaphor of Tristan und Isolde in his two paintings.

== Reception ==
A critic for Le Gaulois praised Tristan and Isolde (Death) during its 1911 exhibition at the Salon of the Société Nationale des Beaux-Arts, describing it as a particularly striking painting within Egusquiza's depictions of Wagner's works. Péladan also championed the painting in a review of the 1911 Salon:

Sur le corps de Tristan inanimé, Yseult morte d'amor est couchée: ainsi M. de Egusquiza continue son vœu pictural à la gloire de Wagner, vœu qui compte déjà tant d'ex-voto d'une si belle piété. [...] M. de Egusquiza, par la constance de son culte, réjouit tous les fanatiques du tout-puissant Maître.

—Joséphin Péladan, "Michel-Ange et le Salon de la Société Nationale", 1911
Translation:

Isolde, dead from love, lies on top of Tristan's lifeless body: thus Mr Egusquiza continues with his pictorial vow to the glory of Wagner, a vow already expressed in so many ex votos of extremely beautiful piety. [...] Due to the fidelity of his worship, Mr Egusquiza delights all the fanatical admirers of the all-powerful Master.

—translated by Lourdes Jiménez

Camille Le Senne, writing for Le Ménestrel, was more critical; though he applauded Egusquiza for the effort in producing the painting, he felt that it did not meet the standards of Wagner's music.

Tristan and Isolde (Life) received similarly mixed reviews from the contemporary French press the following year. A reviewer for Le Gaulois introduced the work as a continuation of Egusquiza's Wagnerian series, writing that the artist had a profound understanding of the source material. However, Le Senne criticized the painting: "Nous rentrons dans la série des sujets avec [...] le Tristan et Isolde de M. Roger de Egusquiza, dont la couleur ne vaut pas le dessin" ("We return to the series of subjects with [...] the Tristan and Isolde of Mr Roger de Egusquiza, whose colour is not worth the drawing").

== Sources ==
- Barón-Nusbaum, Brandin (2013). "Forgotten Wizard: The Scenographic Innovations of Mariano Fortuny". In Reilly, Kara (ed.). Theatre, Performance and Analogue Technology: Historical Interfaces and Intermedialities. Palgrave Studies in Performance and Technology. Palgrave Macmillan. pp. 73–93. ISBN 978-1-349-45742-7. OCLC 856053425.
- Beruete y Moret, Aureliano de (1918). Rogelio de Egusquiza: pintor y grabador (in Spanish). Madrid: Blass y Cía. OCLC 431613466.
- "Bloc-Notes Parisien: le vernissage a la Nationale". Le Gaulois (in French). 14 April 1912 – via Gallica.
- Carmena de la Cruz, Patricia (1993). "Los dibujos wagnerianos de Egusquiza existentes en la Biblioteca Nacional de Madrid". Anuario del Departamento de Historia y Teoría del Arte (UAM) (in Spanish). V: 131–142.
- Casado Rigalt, Daniel (2006). José Ramón Mélida (1856–1933) y la arqueología española (in Spanish). Madrid: Real Academia de la Historia. ISBN 9788495983725.
- Chafe, Eric (2005). The Tragic and the Ecstatic: The Musical Revolution of Wagner's Tristan and Isolde. Oxford University Press. ISBN 978-0-19-517647-6. OCLC 429407239.
- Jiménez, Lourdes (2016). "Tristan and Isolde. Death by Rogelio de Egusquiza" (PDF). Bilbao Fine Arts Museum. Archived (PDF) from the original on 17 July 2020.
- Le Senne, Camille (6 May 1911). "La Musique et le Théatre aux Salons du Grand Palais (Troisième Article)". Le Ménestrel (in French) – via Gallica.
- Le Senne, Camille (4 May 1912). "La Musique et le Théatre aux Salons du Grand Palais (Troisième Article)". Le Ménestrel (in French) – via Gallica.
- Kahane, Martine; Wild, Nicole (1983). Wagner et la France. Paris: Herscher. ISBN 978-2-7335-0059-0. OCLC 311779072 – via Gallica.
- "Notes Sociales". Le Gaulois (in French). 16 April 1911 – via Gallica.
- Péladan, Joséphin (8 May 1909). "Au Salon de la Societé Nationale". L'Instantané (Supplément illustré de la Revue hebdomaire). Paris. pp. 254–273.
- Péladan, Joséphin (6 May 1911). "Michel-Ange et le Salon de la Société Nationale". La Revue hebdomadaire (in French) – via Gallica.
- Suárez Cortina, Manuel (2013). Santander hace un siglo (in Spanish). Santander: Editorial Universidad de Cantabria. ISBN 9788481026689.
- Suárez García, José Ignacio (2013–2014). "España en Bayreuth: relación de asistentes a los festivales wagnerianos a través de las Fremdenlisten". Recerca Musicològica (in Spanish). XX–XXI: 305–329.
- Wagner, Richard (1912). Henderson, W. J. (ed.). Tristan and Isolde. New York: Dodd, Mead & Co. OCLC 607121.
