= Arab Coffeehouse =

Painting by Henri Matisse

- Le café Maure (French)
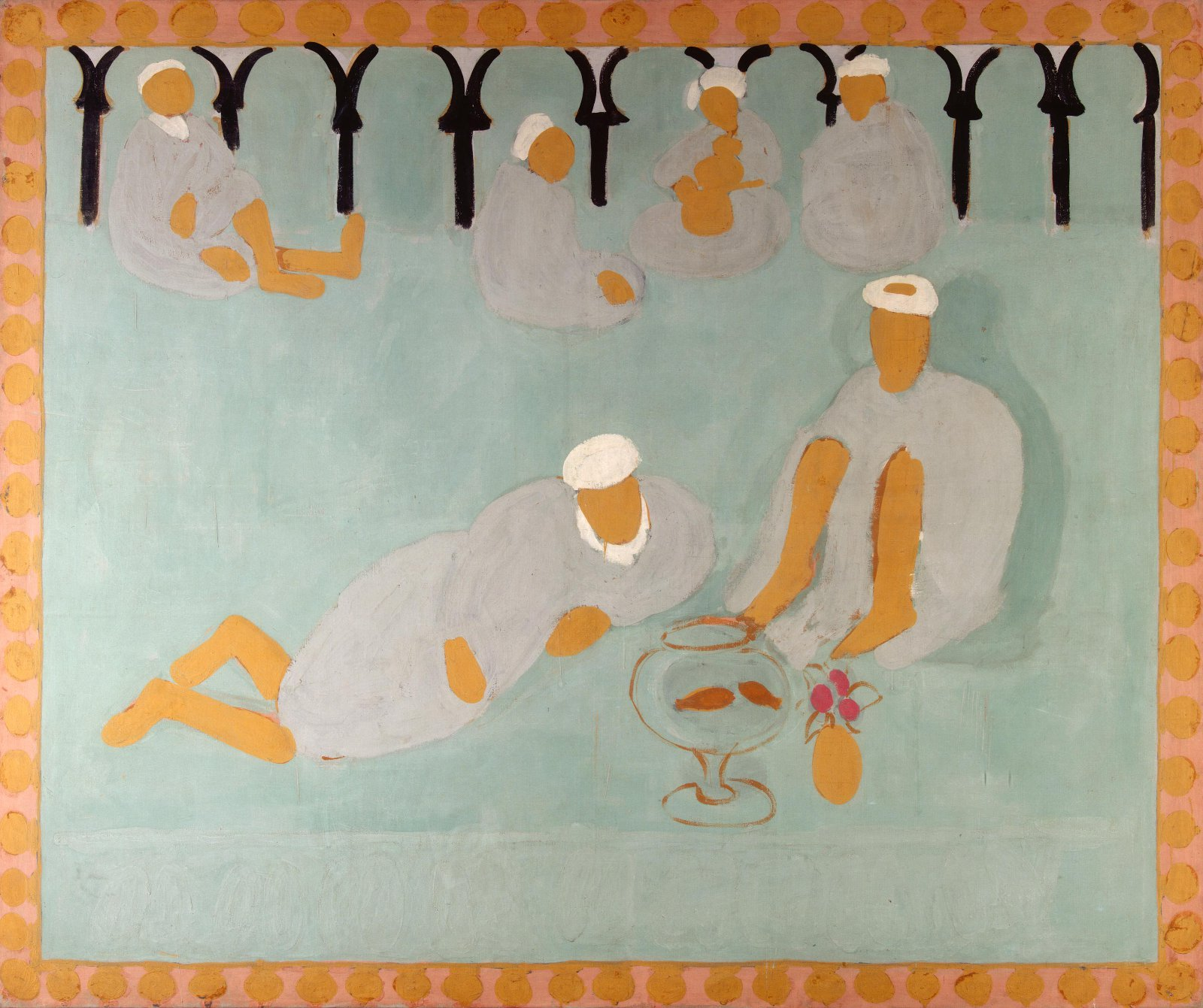
- Artist: Henri Matisse
- Year: 1912–1913
- Medium: Distemper on canvas
- Dimensions: 176 cm × 210 cm (69 in × 83 in)
- Location: Hermitage Museum; St. Petersburg

Arab Coffeehouse (Note: Alternatively spelled Arab coffee house, and also called The Arab Café or simply Arab Café.) (French name: Le café Maure), is a distemper-on-canvas painting by French visual artist Henri Matisse. Produced in 1913, Arab Coffeehouse was part of a series of goldfish paintings that Matisse produced in the 1910s and 1920s.

== Background ==
In 1912, Matisse visited Tangier, Morocco, where he noted how the locals would be fascinated for hours by goldfish swimming in bowls. Matisse was noted to admire the lifestyle of the Moroccans. Like other 20th-century cosmopolitan Parisian artists, Matisse "valued Islamic art for its ornamental exuberance and anti-illusionistic qualities".

Shortly after returning from Morocco to his studio in Issy-les-Moulineaux, Matisse produced a series of nine paintings between the spring and early summer of 1912. That series included some works featuring goldfish, such as Goldfish. The animal would become a frequently-recurring motif in Matisse's art.

While working on Arab Coffeehouse, Matisse essentially promised Russian art collector Ivan Morozov the piece, to go along with a triptych he was also working on. However, Sergei Shchukin, another Russian art collector would instead acquire Arab Coffeehouse. Shchukin also commissioned four more pieces for his Pink Room collection. Morozov would never again commission Matisse after this.

== Description and composition ==
Some art history sources include 1911 and 1912 in the painting's dating, though the Hermitage Museum's web entry on Arab Coffeehouse states the piece originated in 1913, being executed in the early part of that year. Matisse completed the painting during his second trip to Morocco.

A large composition, the piece has been described as "the most abstract of all his Moroccan paintings," as well as the "most Oriental of all his Oriental paintings". The piece's surface is suffused by a green turquoise color that "[dissolves] distinctions within a fluid realm, [and links] the Oriental air and light to the watery sphere marked only by a confining line". The turquoise color is placed in an expansive space within the painting, while the figures are a "calm light grey". Together the space and the figures within it are "set off by patches of warm ochre".

The Moroccans depicted in the painting are figured "in an attitude of profound attention". The Hermitage noted the painting had a slow development. Originally containing "more concrete observations of nature and greater variety in colour," Matisse gradually removed elements from the painting and employed an "expressive simplification". The still figures found in the painting are isolated from the world around them. Additionally, they are "grouped around two central elements: the glass aquarium with the goldfish in the foreground and the musical instrument being played in the background".

== Themes and analysis ==
The Hermitage wrote that Arab Coffeehouse is "the epitome of absolute inner peace," referencing the figures in the painting being cut off from their surroundings, "as if they had lost consciousness of their bodily weight". Furthermore, the glass aquarium holding the goldfish inside and the musical instrument in the background "are the origin of the meditative state which holds the figures in its power".

Admiring what he perceived as a "relaxed and contemplative" lifestyle possessed by the Moroccans, Matisse would come to utilize goldfish as a symbolization of a tranquil mindset.

== Provenance and legacy ==
Shchukin acquired the work from Matisse in 1913, and wrote a letter to Matisse stating, "I love [the painting] now more than the others and I look at it for no less than an hour at a time." The piece's provenance involves the Russian state nationalizing Shchukin's collection in 1918.

After his death in 1936, Shchukin's mansion became the State Museum of New Western Art. In 1948, the State Museum was shut down on orders from Joseph Stalin, with its pieces being split between the Pushkin Museum in Moscow and the Hermitage Museum in St. Petersburg.

Since 1948, the latter has been the location of Arab Coffeehouse. The work has been described as "the most important painting in Matisse's Moroccan cycle". The piece is referenced in Resolution, a novel by Denise Mina published in 2001.

== See also ==
- List of works by Henri Matisse
- Coffeehouses in the Islamic world
- Zorah on the Terrace, 1912 companion piece
