= Henri Matisse and goldfish =

Painting series by Henri Matisse

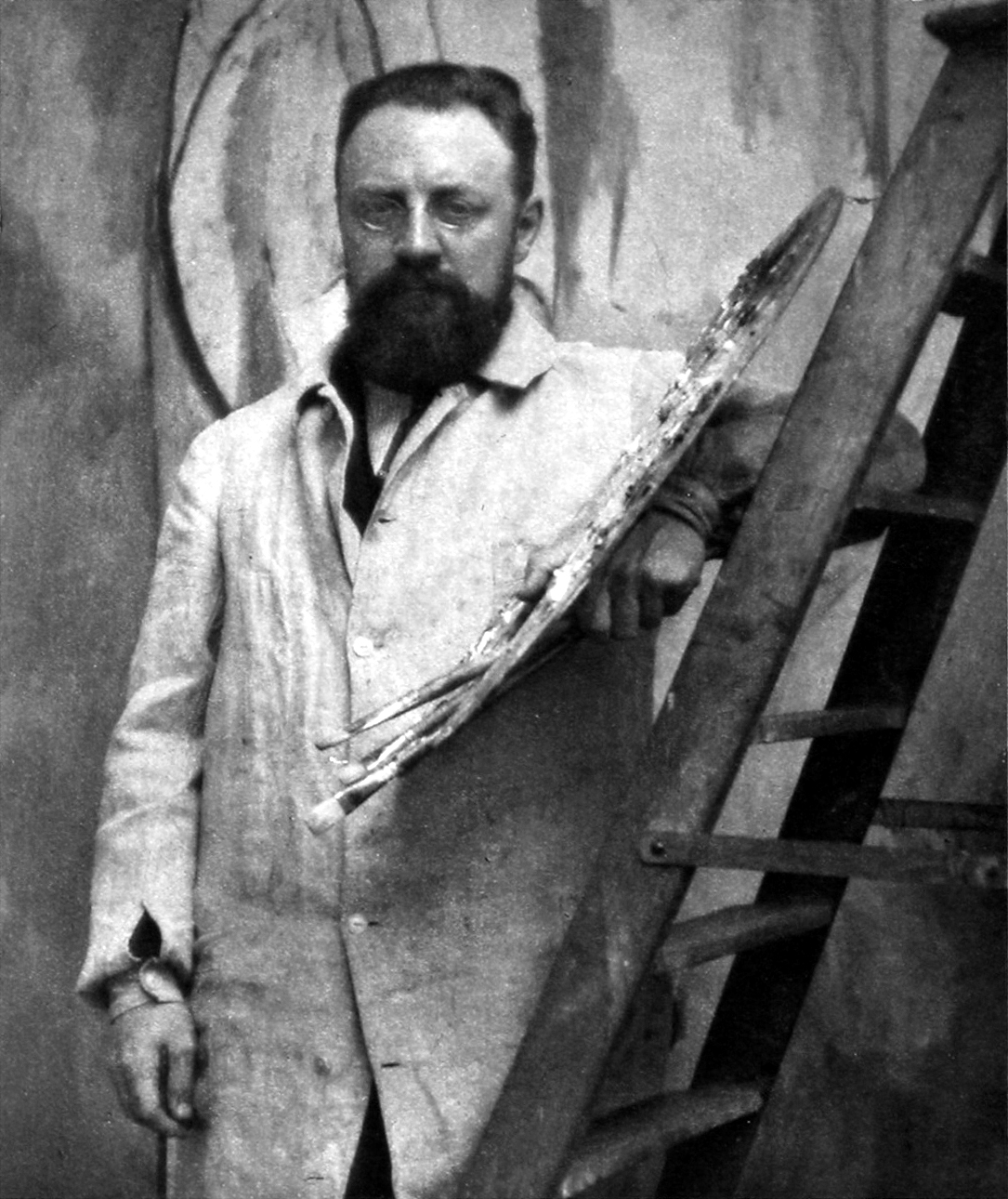
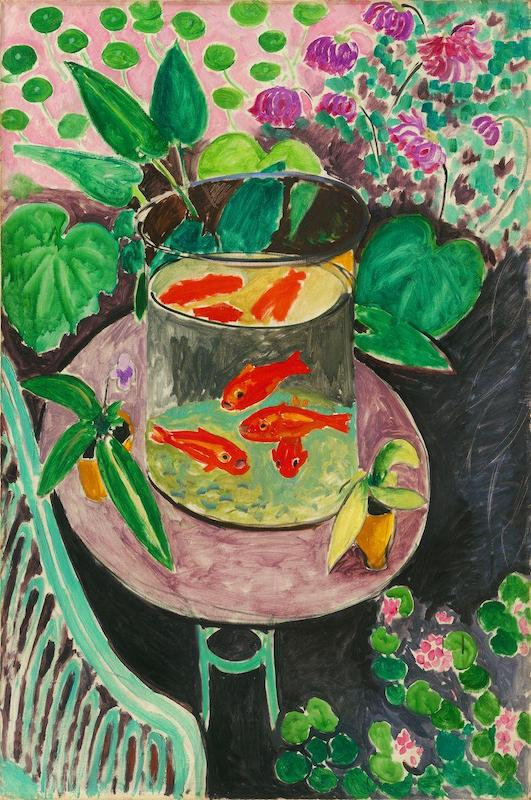
Henri Matisse in 1913 and his 1912 Goldfish painting

French visual artist Henri Matisse was known for his use of color and draughtsmanship. In the early 20th century, Matisse became a leader of the Fauvism art movement, which was an early movement in the broader Post-impressionist era.

After a trip to Morocco in 1912 Matisse employed goldfish in aquariums as a motif in his art. While retaining the use of color which he is notable for, Matisse included goldfish in various still life scenarios, often as a feature found in depictions of his various studios rather than the focus of pieces.

The motif would be present in Matisse's art mostly during the early and mid-1910s, but also in the 1920s. Most of these pieces were oil on canvas still life paintings, but Matisse would produce etchings, drawings, and prints featuring the motif in 1929.

Art historians have commented that Matisse's works featuring goldfish explore the themes of contemplation, tranquility, and pictorial space, with Matisse configuring complex arrangements for the latter. The aquariums the goldfish swim around in function as a metaphor for the studio.

== Background ==
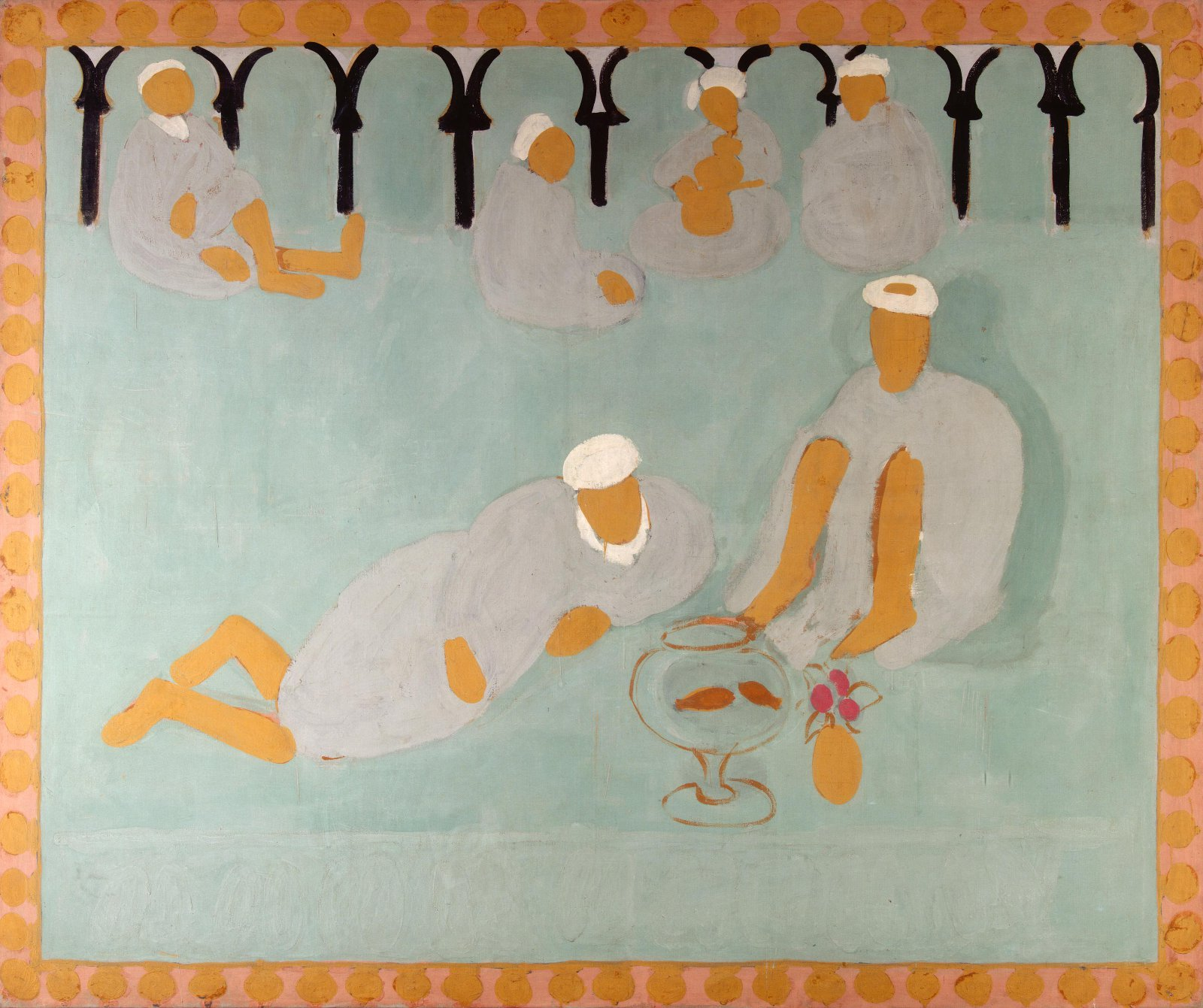
Arab Coffeehouse, 1912–1913, depicts Matisse's encounters in Morocco

In the first two decades of the 20th century, Matisse visited Islamic art exhibitions. He also traveled to Algeria and Morocco, collecting pottery, textiles, and tiles. In 1909, Matisse moved from Paris to nearby Issy-les-Moulineaux to escape Parisian pressures. He portrayed his Issy studio in The Red Studio (L'Atelier Rouge), a 1911 oil on canvas painting considered one of the most influential pieces of modern art by experts. The studio would be often depicted in Matisse's goldfish paintings that would follow.

In January 1912, Matisse visited Tangier in Morocco, where he stayed through April. While there, Matisse noted how the locals were drawn to watching goldfish swim around in bowls. Matisse admired the "relaxed and contemplative" lifestyle Moroccans had, a view shared with other Europeans who visited North Africa, according to Smarthistory. Previously in 1908, Matisse wrote that he dreamed of:

an art of balance, of purity and serenity, devoid of troubling or depressing subject matter, an art that could be [...] a soothing, calming influence on the mind, something like a good armchair that provides relaxation from fatigue.

== Goldfish era ==
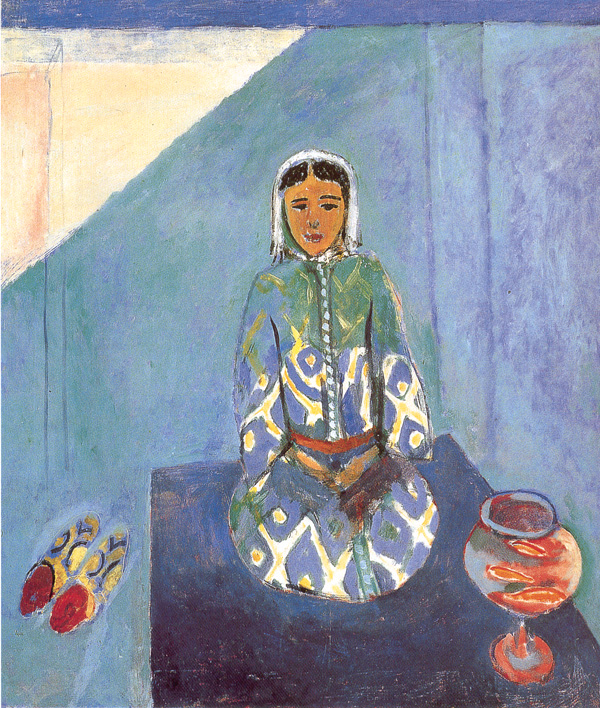
Zorah on the Terrace, 1912–13

Goldfish became a frequently recurring motif in Matisse's art from 1912 to 1915. (Note: Artforum and the Pushkin Museum also include 1911 as part of the period in which goldfish frequently appeared in Matisse's art.) Sculptures, flowers, and windows were also common motifs found in Matisse's goldfish paintings. The 1910s decade was "an extremely reflective period of his career when new spatial configurations were explored," and found Matisse using Cubist devices "for his illusionary ends, so as to paradoxically suggest enclosure."

After returning to Issy from his trip to Morocco, Matisse produced a series of nine paintings during the spring and early summer of 1912, of which Goldfish was included. Unlike his other paintings featuring the titular animals, this painting featured the goldfish as its focus. Goldfish and Sculpture was also painted in this spring–summer 1912 period. This painting features his Reclining Nude from 1907, now taking on "the peachy skin tone of an imagined Caucasian model." Matisse also produced the piece, Studio with Goldfish (L'Atelier aux poissons rouges), dated May–end of September 1912.

Matisse would later depict his experience visiting Morocco in Arab Coffeehouse (Le café Maure) (1912–13). A companion piece, Zorah on the Terrace portrays a woman gazing at fish. In both Arab Coffeehouse and Zorah on the Terrace figure their subjects "in an attitude of profound attention."

In 1914, he produced Interior with a Goldfish Bowl, (Note: Interior with a Goldfish Bowl is alternatively known as Interior, Goldfish Bowl and Interior with Goldfish. Not to be confused with Studio with Goldfish (1912), which is also alternatively called Interior with Goldfish.) which has a notable use of blue color. Goldfish with Palette, dated November 1914–spring 1915, was also made during this period. These two pieces were painted at Matisse's studio at 19, quai Saint-Michel.

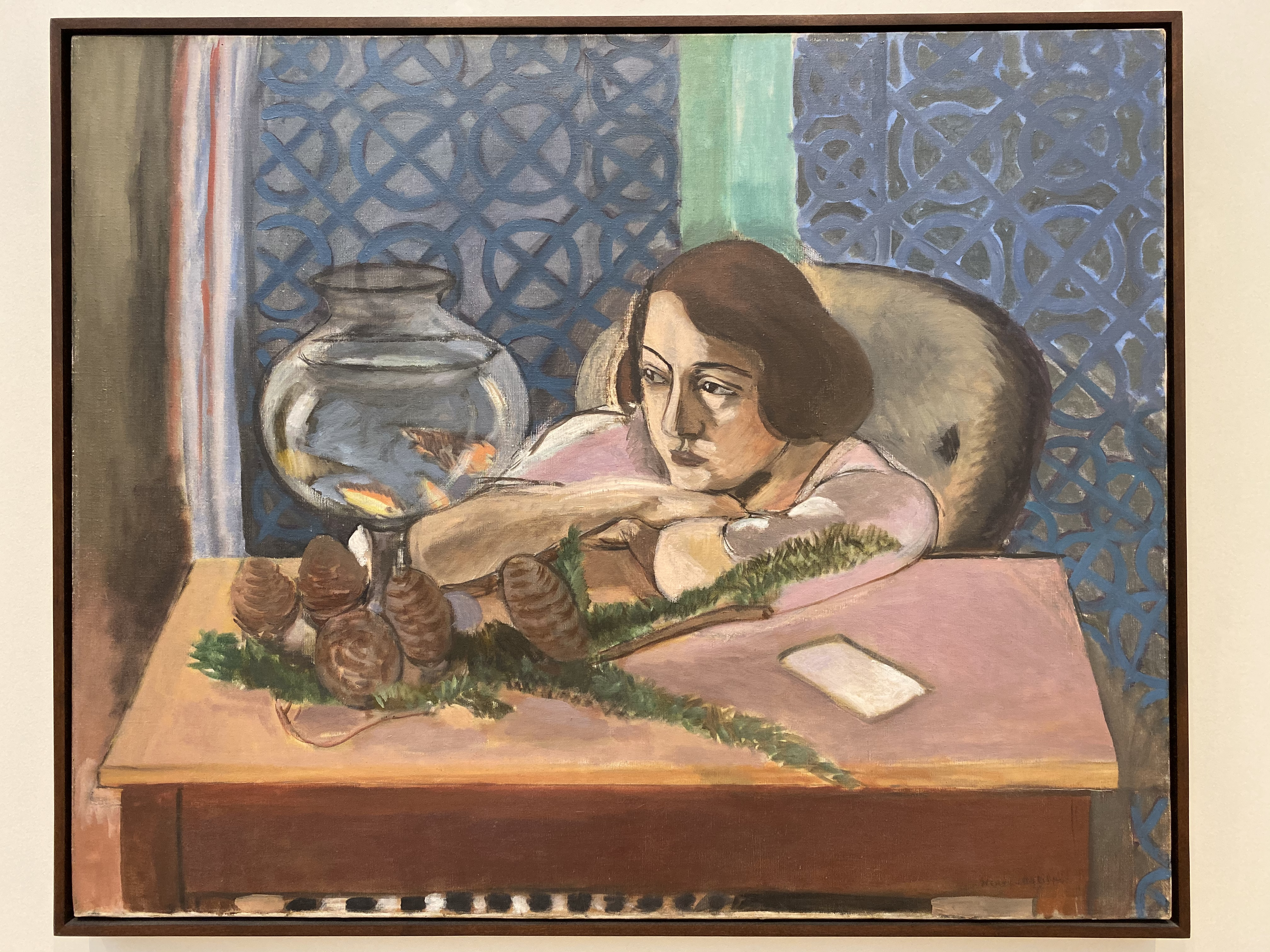
Woman Before an Aquarium, 1921–1923

Goldfish would again appear in Matisse's work in the following decade, such as in The Goldfish Bowl (winter 1921–22). Now living in Nice by this point, Matisse employed a particular interest in sunlight streaming in from a window in this piece. Young Woman before an Aquarium (Jeune fille devant un aquarium) was also painted during this time, between September 1921 and February 1922. A similar Woman before an Aquarium painting (dated 1921–1923), included elements Matisse encountered in his trips to North Africa. The interior scene includes a decorative patterned textile screen.

In 1929, Matisse once again included goldfish in his art. He produced a variety of drawings and prints featuring the motif. In November, he produced a series of ten etchings featuring a female head looking at a goldfish bowl. While working on the series, Matisse sketched directly onto small, hand-held copper plates. For many of the sketches, Matisse employed a chine-collé printmaking technique.

== Themes and analysis ==
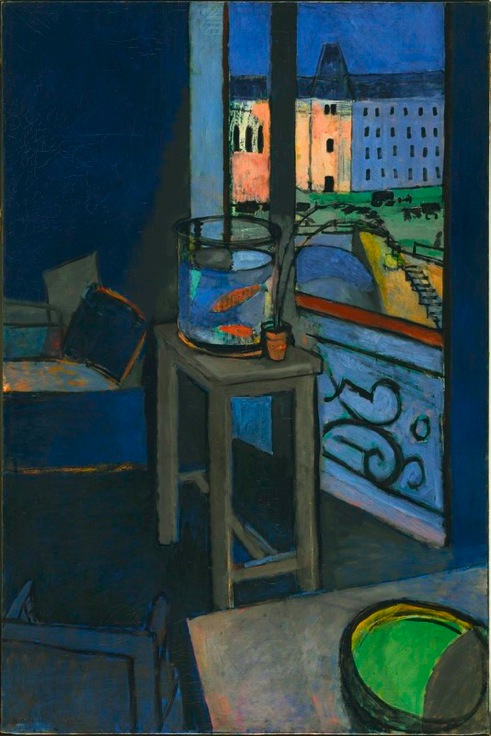
Interior with a Goldfish Bowl, 1914

The goldfish motif has been connected to theme of contemplation. Noted to be aware of this theme, Matisse once remarked to Marcel Sembat, "those big devils, there for hours, contemplative, before a flower and some red fish." On Goldfish and Palette, this "artistic meditation is stressed, as the Moroccans' gaze becomes likened to the artist's own reflections on artistic containment." Goldfish also came to symbolize a tranquil and serene state of mind that he perceived the Moroccans to have, which he admired, as well as a "paradise lost". Appealing for "contemplative relaxation for the viewer" was a major theme in Matisse's work found in Goldfish.

Pictorial space and its configuration is also a common theme found in the goldfish paintings. Goldfish had a "complex construction of pictorial space." The arrangement of Interior with a Goldfish Bowl "underscores Matisse's interest in windows as passageways between interior and exterior spaces." Matisse's studio is often found in the goldfish paintings, and the goldfish swimming around in aquariums has been viewed as a metaphor for the studio. Kate Linker of Artforum wrote that implicit features "in these studios" are extended to other spaces, elaborating that "the spaces in Matisse's paintings are not generally organized by formal coherence or design, but in a symbolic manner, using repetitions of shape and hue, thematic analogies or pictorial effects to enforce, or embody, their meaning."

Linker also wrote that:

The roundness of The Red Studio returns us to the goldfish bowl, to which the painting bears clear affinities. If the bowl functions as a metaphor for space and for the artwork in its role of spatial summation, then The Red Studio can be regarded as its analogue."

In 2022, Broadsheet commented on Interior with a Goldfish Bowl, writing that the piece has "a special resonance for the contemporary viewer," and calling it "a really rewarding work to look at in the age of [COVID-19], when we've all spent a little bit too long our own private space."

== Exhibitions and museum collections ==
In 2010, the Museum of Modern Art (MoMA) in New York held the "Matisse: Radical Invention, 1913–1917" exhibition. Interior with Goldfish and Goldfish and Palette were paired together at the exhibition. Goldfish and Sculpture is also found at the MoMA. As of 2022, Matisse's goldfish paintings are located in art museums throughout the world.

== List of goldfish works ==
=== Paintings ===
Name (French name)	Year	Dimensions	City	Gallery	Notes
Goldfish	1912	57 in × 38 in. (146 cm × 97 cm)	Moscow, Russia	Pushkin Museum	
Goldfish and Sculpture	1912	46 × 39 5/8 in. (116.2 × 100.5 cm)	New York City, United States	Museum of Modern Art	(Note: Artforum wrote that goldfish first appeared in Matisse's art in 1911, in Goldfish and Sculpture. The piece, however, is dated 1912 on its official Museum of Modern Art webpage.)
Fish Tank in the Room	1912	82 × 93 cm	Copenhagen, Denmark	National Gallery of Denmark	
Studio with Goldfish (L'Atelier aux poissons rouges)	1912	46 7/16 × 39 15/16 in. (118 × 101.5 cm)	Philadelphia, United States	The Barnes Foundation	
Zorah on the Terrace	1912–13	116 × 100 cm	Moscow, Russia	Pushkin Museum	
Arab Coffeehouse (Le café Maure)	1912–13	176 × 210 cm	St. Petersburg, Russia	Hermitage Museum	(Note: The Smarthistory source dates this piece from 1911 to 1913, and both it and Artforum alternatively refer to Arab Coffeehouse as The Arab Café.)
Interior with a Goldfish Bowl (Les poissons rouges (Intérieur, bocal de poissons rouges))	1914	147 × 97 cm	Paris, France	Centre Pompidou	
Goldfish and Palette	1914–15	57 3/4 × 44 1/4 in. (146.5 × 112.4 cm)	New York City, United States	Museum of Modern Art	
The Goldfish Bowl	1921–22	21 3/8 × 25 3/4 in. (54.3 × 65.4 cm)	New York City, United States	Metropolitan Museum of Art	
Young Woman before an Aquarium (Jeune fille devant un aquarium)	1921–22	18 1/4 × 21 5/8 in. (46.4 × 54.9 cm)	Philadelphia, United States	The Barnes Foundation	
Woman before an Aquarium	1921–23	31 15/16 × 39 7/16 in. (81.2 × 100.2 cm)	Chicago, United States	Art Institute of Chicago	

=== Drawings and prints ===
Name (French name)	Year	Medium	Dimensions	City	Gallery	Notes
Girl with Fishbowl	1929	Etching	Plate: 3 5/8 × 4 7/8 in. (9.21 x 12.38 cm); Sheet: 11 1/8 × 14 1/2 in. (28.26 x 36.83 cm)	Minneapolis, United States	Minneapolis Institute of Art	
Head of a Young Girl and Two Goldfish	1929	Etching in black on cream wove paper laid down on ivory wove paper (chine collé)	82 × 115 mm (Note: The image of this piece is 82 × 115 mm, while the work has the additional dimensions: 88 × 123 mm (primary support); 90 × 125 mm (plate); 284 × 380 mm (secondary support).)	Chicago, United States	Art Institute of Chicago	
Woman with a Fishbowl	1929	Etching with chine collé	3 5/8 × 4 3/4 in. (9.2 × 12.1 cm)	New York City, United States	Metropolitan Museum of Art	
Young Woman Contemplating a Goldfish Bowl (Jeune femme contemplant un bocal de poissons rouges)	1929	Etching with chine collé	Plate: 3 15/16 × 5 7/8 in. (10 × 15 cm); sheet: 11 × 15 1/16 in. (28 × 38.2 cm)	New York City, United States	Museum of Modern Art	
