= Sackville Street, London =

Street in the City of Westminster, London

Coordinates: 51.5095°N 0.1383°W

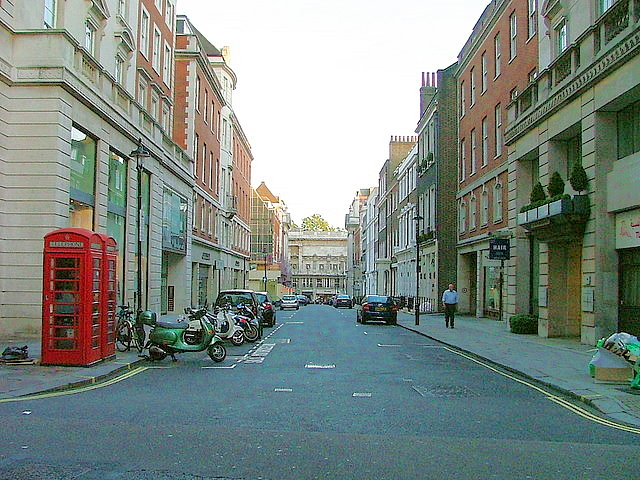
Sackville Street, looking south towards Piccadilly

Sackville Street is a street in the City of Westminster which today is mainly composed of offices and the rears of retail premises, but once was the home to several important medical figures.

== Location ==
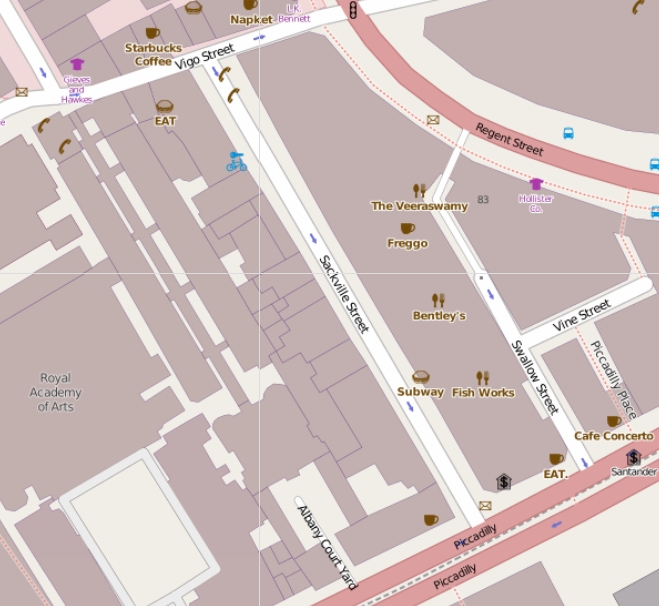
The location of Sackville Street within London

The street runs between Vigo Street in the north and Piccadilly in the south. It has no other exits.

== History ==
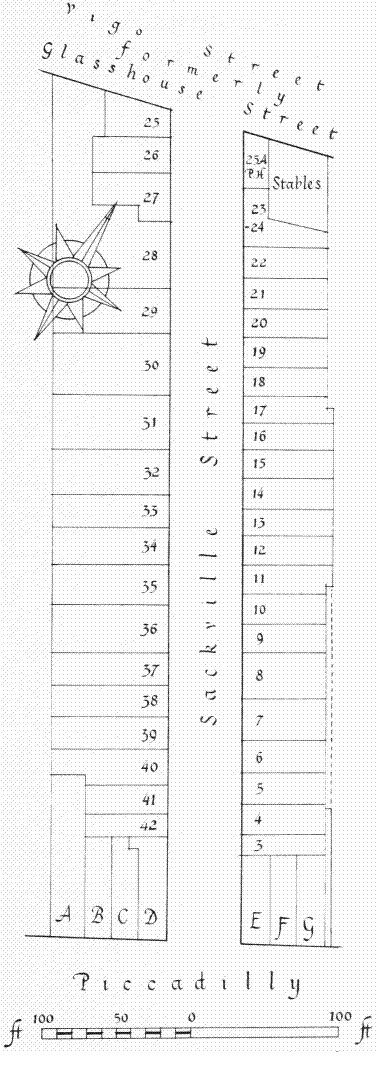
Sackville Street on a 1742 plan

The land on which Sackville Street stands, like Albany and Burlington House, was formerly known as Stone Conduit Close. It was bounded on one side by Penniless Bank and on the other by Swallow Close. It passed into Crown ownership in 1536 and formerly belonged to the Abbot and Convent of Abingdon. The land was then much divided, leases granted and ended, and ownership changed several times. Sackville Street is first mentioned in the Ratebooks in 1679.

By 1730 the former leases on the land that is currently Sackville Street had all expired and William Pulteney, later the Earl of Bath, had the site cleared in order to rebuild the street. The rebuilding laid out the street according to the former leasehold divisions with the houses on the west side corresponding with Richard Bull's former lease, and the roadway and eastern side houses corresponding with the former interests of Edward Bew and Robert Chipp.

On 1 May 1730, Pulteney signed an agreement with Thomas Phillips of St. George's, carpenter, and John Mist of St. Anne's paviour. These were likely the principal contractors for the construction of the houses, and by 1733 most of the houses were completed. From the start the street attracted a mixed occupancy and included fine homes and shops. At the time of building it included two apothecaries, a cheesemonger, a tavern and a coffee house. Tailors were also prominent, including 13 listed in the Post Office directory of 1830.

== Former residents ==
Willem van de Velde the Elder, the Dutch seascape painter, was living in Sackville Street at the time of his death in 1693.

In the late eighteenth and early nineteenth centuries Thomas Gray and William Constable operated as jewellers and goldsmiths in the street. In Jane Austen's Sense and Sensibility (published 1811), Marianne and Elinor Dashwood visit "Gray's", a jeweller in the street and one of only two real world shops mentioned in the Austen novels.

28 Sackville Street was the home of the Sackville Gallery between the two World Wars where the important exhibition of Futurist painting was held in 1912.

30 Sackville Street was the home of Sir Everard Home (1746–1832), Serjeant-Surgeon to the King, and Baronet 1813.

John Snow, the pioneer of anaesthesia, lived at number 18 from 1852 to his death in 1858. Snow is considered one of the fathers of modern epidemiology, in part because of his work in tracing the source of a cholera outbreak in Soho, London, in 1854.

James Yearsley (1805–1869), aural surgeon, once had a clinic at 32 Sackville Street. A green plaque was unveiled on 27 May 1994 which reads "Westminster City Council Dr. James Yearsley, MD, MRCS, LRCP, 1805 - 1869, founded the Metropolitan Ear Institute here in 1838. Mr. Ronnie Yearsley."

== Listed buildings ==
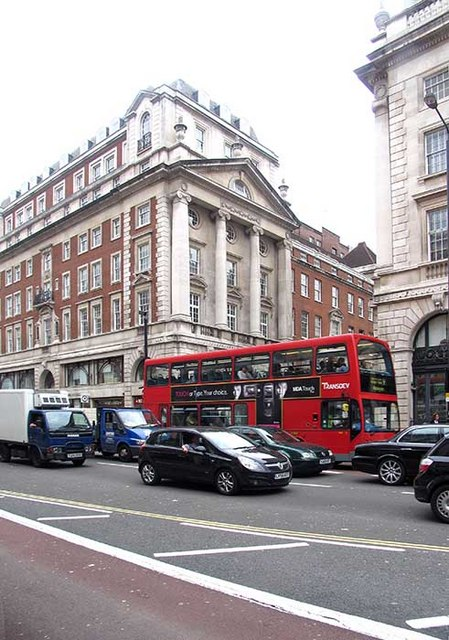
The southern end of Sackville Street where it connects with Piccadilly

Numbers 29, 30 & 30a, 31, 32, 33, 34 & 35, and 36 are all listed with English Heritage.
