= Aureliano de Beruete =

Spanish painter (1845–1912)

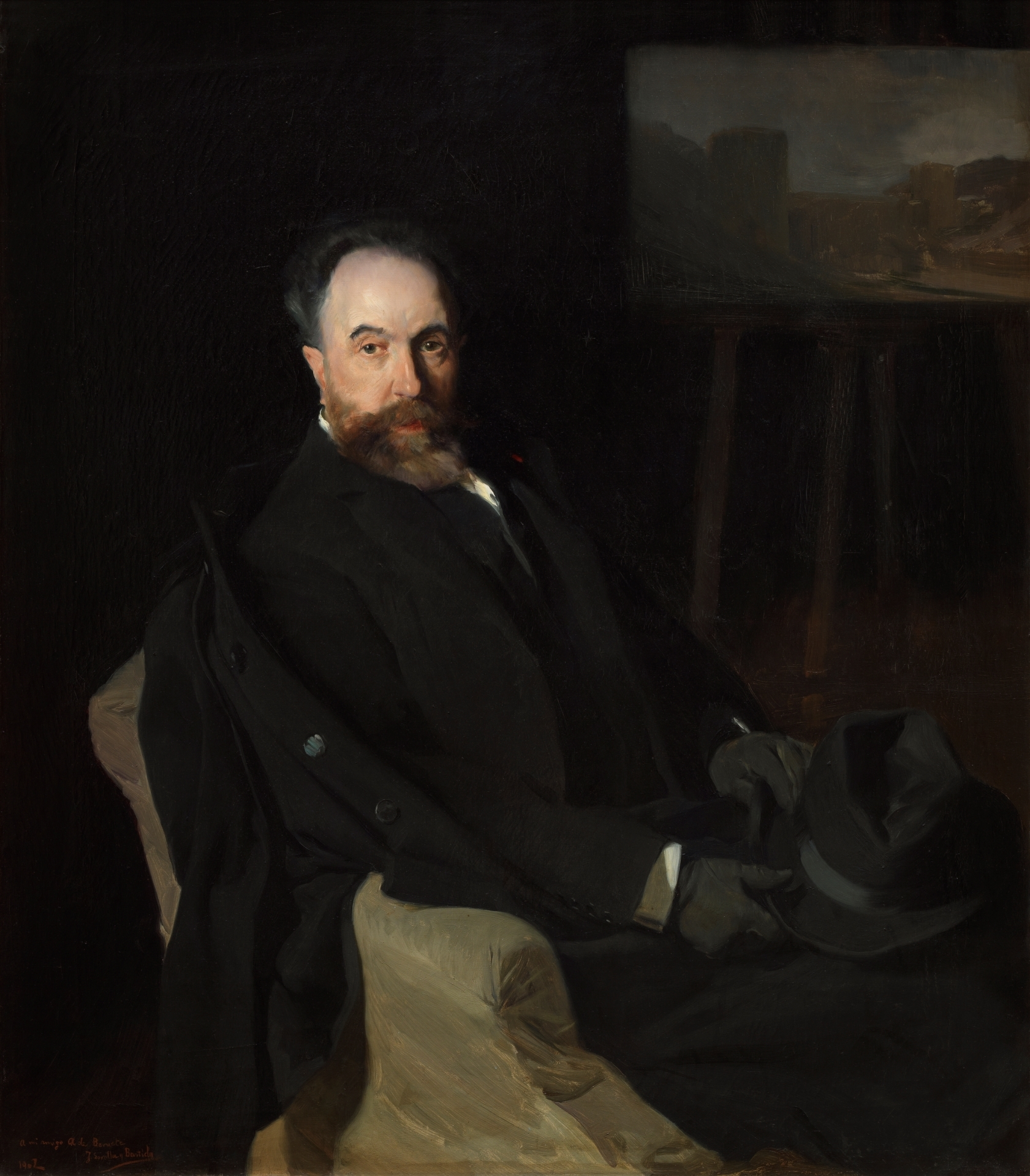
Aureliano de Beruete; portrait by Joaquín Sorolla (1902)

Aureliano de Beruete (27 September 1845, Madrid – 5 January 1912, Madrid) was a Spanish landscape painter, art critic and social activist.

== Biography ==
Born in Madrid into a wealthy family from the minor nobility, he followed his family's wishes, received his Doctorate in Law at the University of Madrid in 1867 and served as a Deputy in the Cortes for two sessions; 1871 and 1872.

He was more inclined to art, however, and had his first lessons at the Real Academia de Bellas Artes de San Fernando, where he studied with Carlos de Haes. His ample income allowed him to devote himself entirely to painting. One of his first works was a depiction of "Orbajosa"; an imaginary village created by Benito Pérez Galdós for his novel Doña Perfecta, which Beruete gave to the author as a gift. Later, he made a trip to Paris, where he was introduced to plein-air painting by Martín Rico.

For many years, he was a professor at the Institución Libre de Enseñanza (which he helped to create) and is often associated with the Generation of '98 or its political movement, Regenerationism. He also supported scientific conferences and excursions, which included a crossing of the Sierra de Guadarrama that he participated in and used as inspiration for many of his works. Throughout his life, he remained an avid traveller and enthusiastic exhibitor. He was awarded the Grand Cross of the Order of Isabella the Catholic in 1900.

During the last years of his life, he wrote several brief treatises on painting and painters, including one of the first monographs on Diego Velázquez, which was published in Paris in 1898. In fact, he numbered most of the great Spanish artists of the day among his friends. After his death in 1912 in Madrid, Joaquín Sorolla organized the first retrospective of Beruete's works, held at Sorolla's mansion.

His son, Aureliano de Beruete y Moret, a critic and art historian, served as Director of the Museo del Prado from 1918 to 1922.

== Writings ==
- Velázquez, pref. Léon Bonnat, Librairie Renouard, Henri Laurens Éditeur, Paris, 1898 ; translated by Sir Hugh Edward Poynter, Methuen & Co. (Classics of Art series), 1906.
  - French reissue : Klincksieck, coll. Les Mondes de l'Art, Paris, 320 p., 2025 ISBN 978-2252047958

== Selected paintings ==
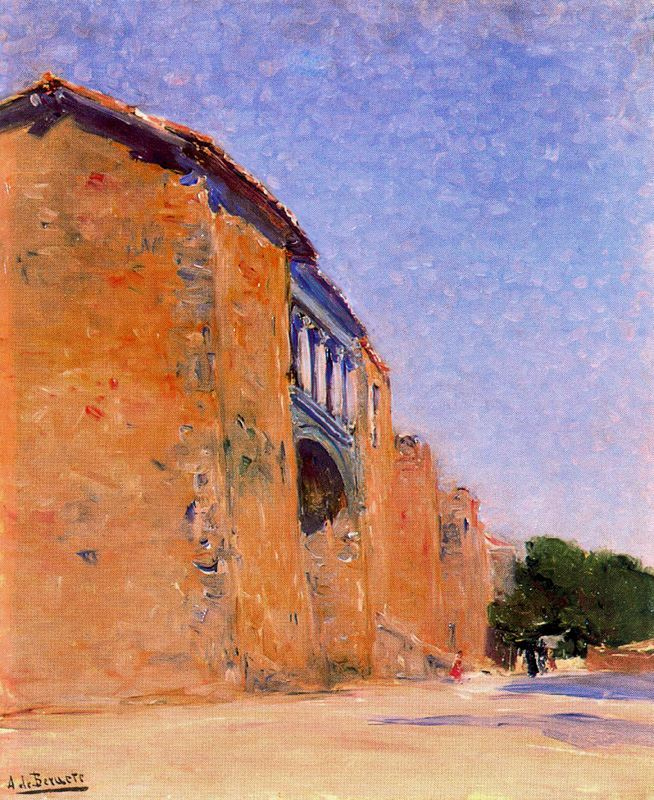
A Door in the Walls of Ávila

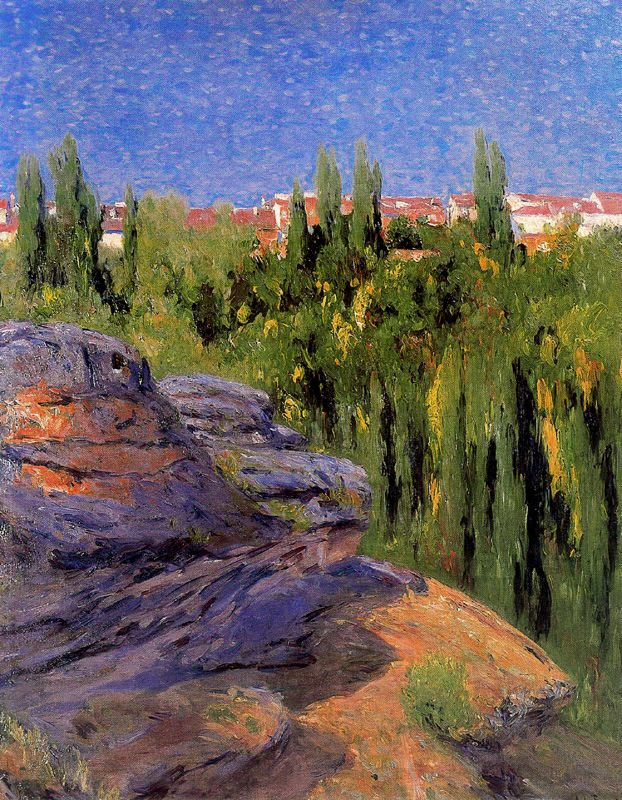
View of Cuenca from
Júcar Gorge

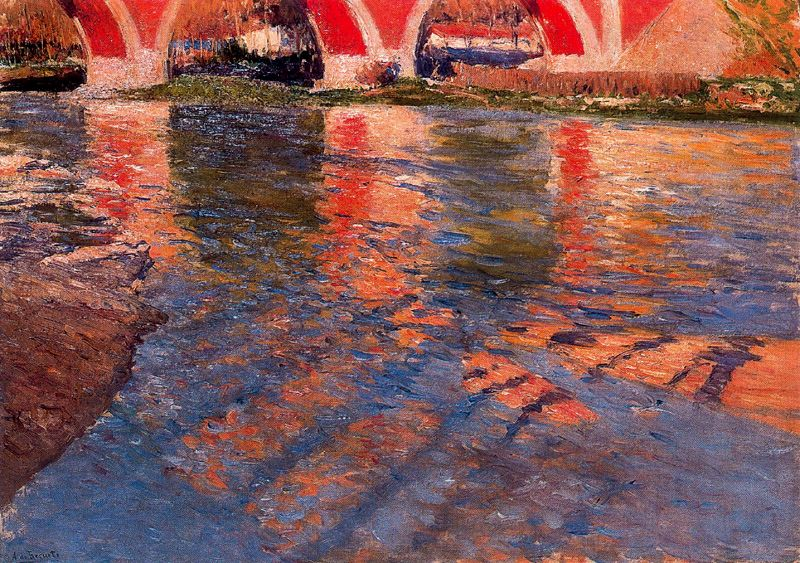
The Manzanares Under the Puente de los Franceses

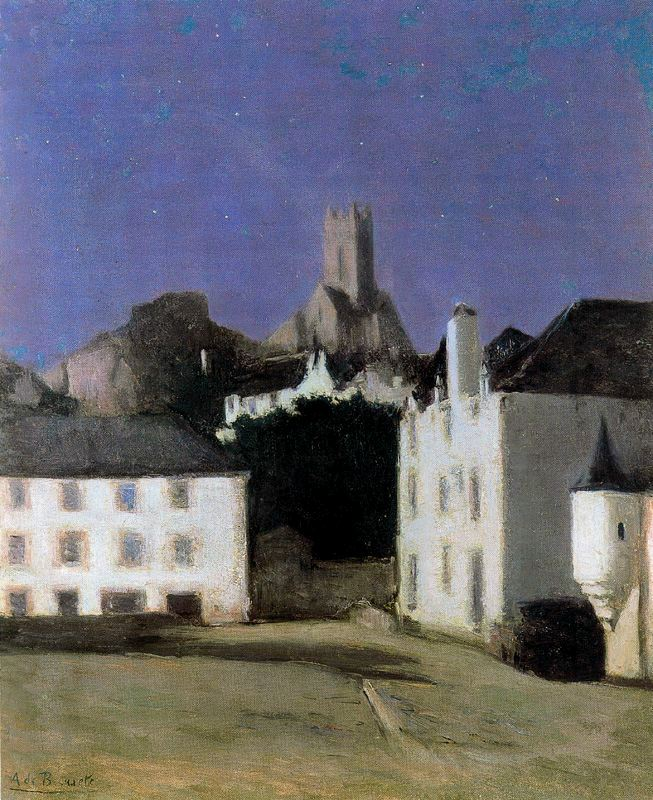
Quimperlé at Night
