= Portrait of Marie Clothilde Guinness =

Painting by Frank Dicksee

- Artist: Frank Dicksee
- Year: 1912
- Type: Oil on canvas, portrait painting
- Dimensions: 233.7 cm × 147.3 cm (92.0 in × 58.0 in)
- Location: Private collection

Portrait of Marie Clothilde Guinness is a 1912 portrait painting by the British artist Frank Dicksee. It depicts Marie Clothilde Guinness, the wife of Ernest Guinness, a member of the Irish brewing dynasty the Guinness family. She is shown at full-length in an emerald silk dress and ostrich feather, having discarded her opera cloak.

Dicksee had made his name in the Victorian era with history paintings and scenes based on literature that shared a tradition with the Pre-Raphaelite Brotherhood but in the Edwardian era he turned towards fashionable portraiture. He was later elected President of the Royal Academy in 1924. The painting was commissioned from him by the sitter and her husband.

This picture was displayed at the Royal Academy Exhibition of 1912 held at Burlington House in London. It was one of the most successful of the many portraits displayed that year. It as auctioned at Christie's in 2010.

== Bibliography ==
- Toll, Simon. Frank Dicksee, 1853–1928: His Art and Life. ACC Art Books, 2016.
