= Sackville Gallery =

Coordinates: 51.5100°N 0.1389°W

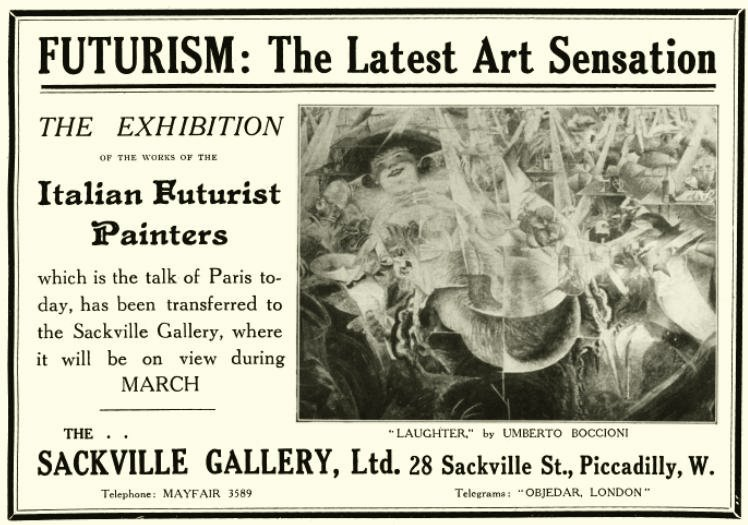
Sackville Gallery Futurism exhibition advert 1912.

The Sackville Gallery was an art gallery at 28 Sackville Street, London, best known for hosting the exhibition of Futurist art in 1912.

The gallery opened in May 1908. It was owned and run by Max Rothschild and Robert René Meyer-Sée until Meyer-Sée left to run the Marlborough Gallery in August 1912. The gallery specialised in the sale of old master works and the Futurist exhibition was untypical of its activities.

The gallery closed in 1939.

== See also ==
- Gilbert de Rorthays
