= Antonio Blanco (painter) =

Painter (1912–1999)

Antonio María Blanco
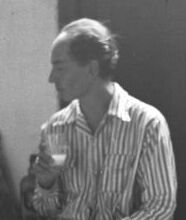
- Antonio Blanco in his Bali home in 1953
- Born: Antonio María Blanco; 15 September 1912; Manila, Insular Government of the Philippine Islands
- Died: 10 December 1999 (aged 87); Denpasar, Bali, Indonesia
- Citizenship: Indonesia
- Known for: Painting, drawing

Don Antonio María Blanco (15 September 1912 – 10 December 1999) was a painter born in the Ermita district of Manila. Blanco died on December 10, 1999, in Denpasar, Bali.

== Biography ==
Antonio Maria Blanco was born in the Ermita district of Manila, Philippine Islands, to Don Antonio Blanco y Álvarez de Mendieta a criollo from Quingua, Bulacan, and Elisa Manuela, an orphan from Tortosa.

He initially lived and worked in Florida and California before developing an interest in the islands of the Pacific Ocean, inspired by artists such as Paul Gauguin and José Miguel Covarrubias. Though he planned to travel to Tahiti, his journey took him to Hawaii, Japan, and Cambodia, where he was a guest of honor of Prince Norodom Sihanouk.

In 1952, Blanco arrived in Bali, and in 1953, he married Ni Ronji, a traditional Balinese dancer. Bali provided Blanco with key elements for his artistic development, including its scenic beauty, dreamlike atmosphere, and rich artistic culture.

Settled in Bali, Blanco built a house and museum in Ubud, where many of his paintings are displayed.

The land on which the construction was erected was given to Blanco by the King of Ubud, Tjokorda Gde Agung Sukawati. Blanco's paintings primarily focus on women, and his style is characterized by romantic-expressive and dreamy qualities.

Blanco received numerous awards, including the Tiffany Fellowship from The Society of Honolulu Artists, the Chevalier du Sahametrai of Cambodia, recognition from the Society of Painters of Fine Art Quality under President Sukarno, and the Prize of the Art Critique in Spain. He was also awarded the Order of Cruz de Caballero by King Juan Carlos I of Spain, granting him the use of the honorific "Don."

Blanco's paintings have been appreciated by numerous collectors, including actress Ingrid Bergman, Mexican singer and actress Thalía, Indonesia's first President Sukarno, the second President Suharto, former Vice President Adam Malik, Prince Norodom Sihanouk, and musician Michael Jackson, among others.

The Blanco Renaissance Museum, a realization of Blanco's lifelong dream, was opened on December 28, 1998, at his residence. The museum displays over 300 of Blanco's works in chronological order, illustrating his artistic development. The building itself reflects the artist's theatrical character and has been compared to the flamboyant style of Salvador Dalí.

Blanco died on December 10, 1999, in Denpasar, Bali, from heart and kidney disease, survived by his wife and four children: Cempaka, Mario, Orchid, and Mahadewi. Since Blanco converted to Hinduism, he had a cremation ceremony in Balinese style in Ubud, which finished on December 28, 1999.

== Gallery ==
His house on a hill in Ubud is now a museum devoted to him.

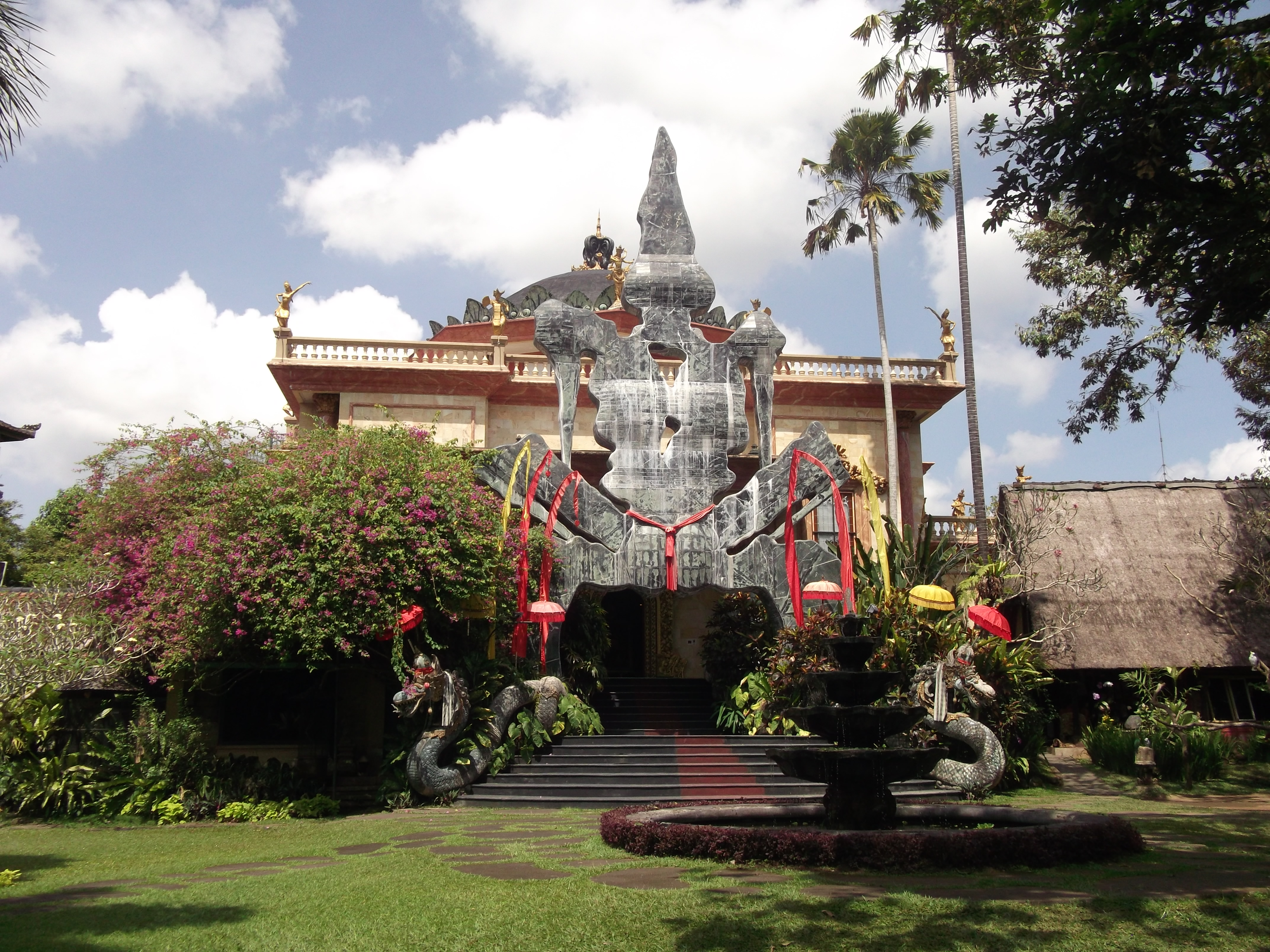
The house and museum of Antonio Blanco in Ubud

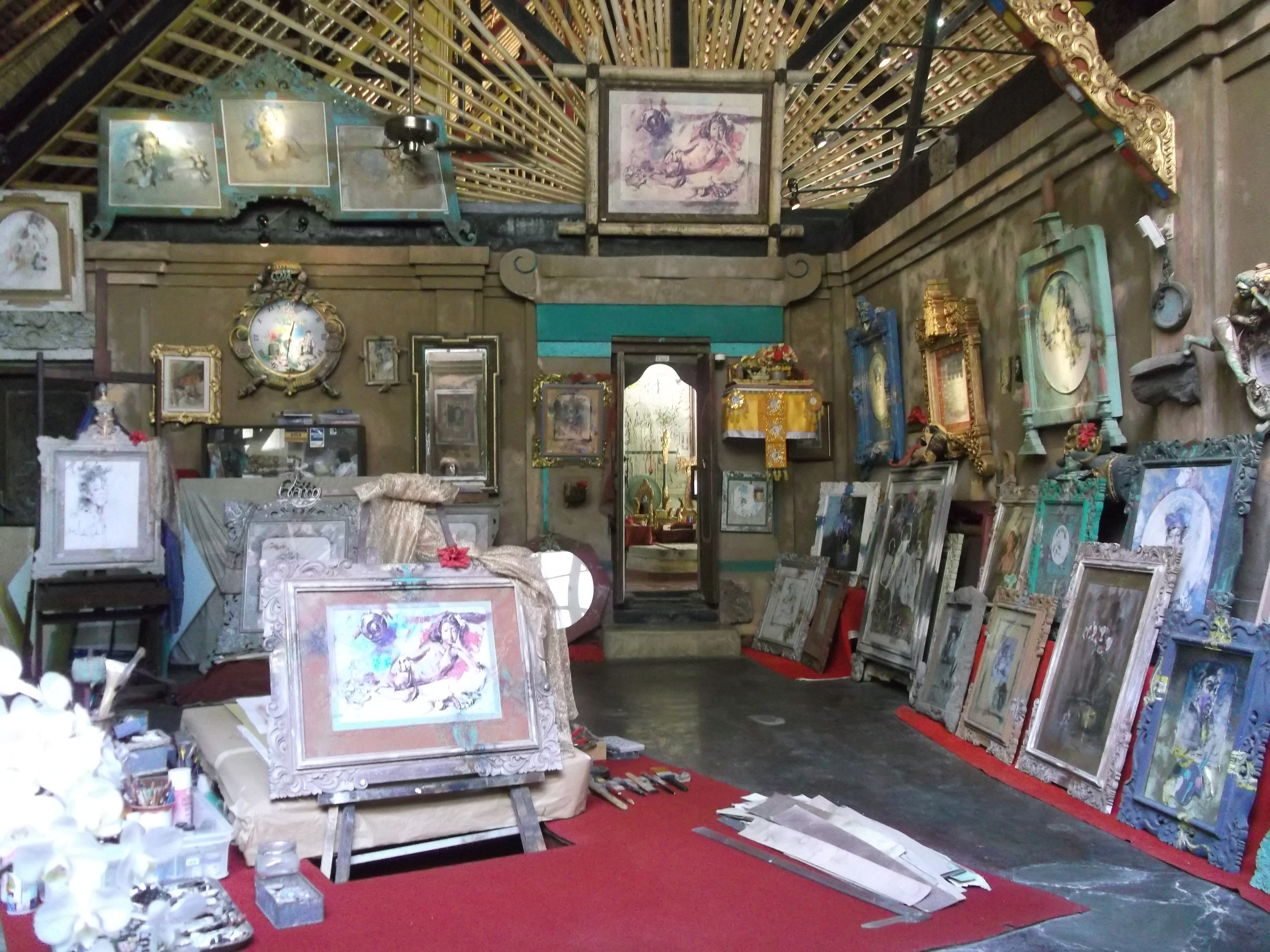
Antonio Blanco's workshop in his museum in Ubud
