= John Leighton (artist) =

English illustrator (1822–1912)

John Leighton FRS
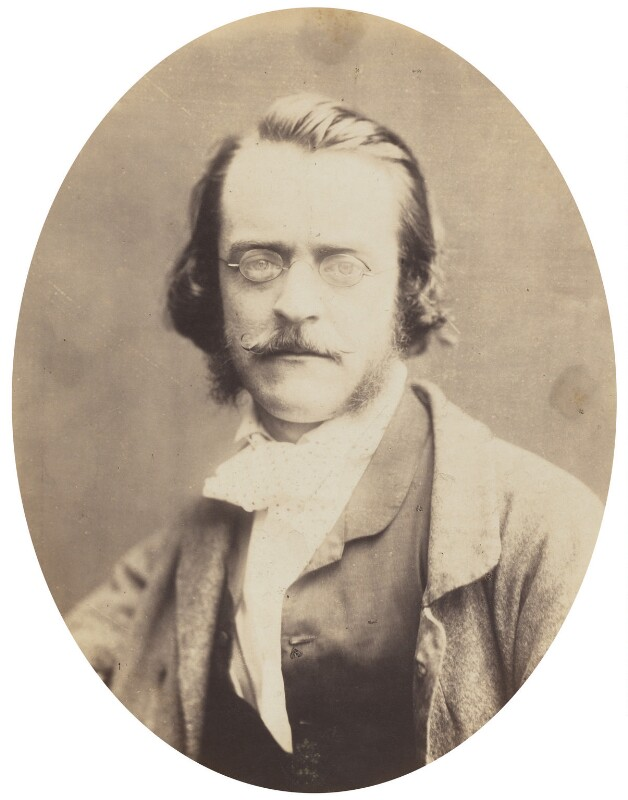
- Born: 15 September 1822; St James Westminster, Middlesex
- Died: 15 September 1912 (aged 90)
- Occupation: Book Cover Designer

John Leighton (15 September 1822 – 15 September 1912) was an English artist notable for his book illustrations and book cover designs.

== Biography ==
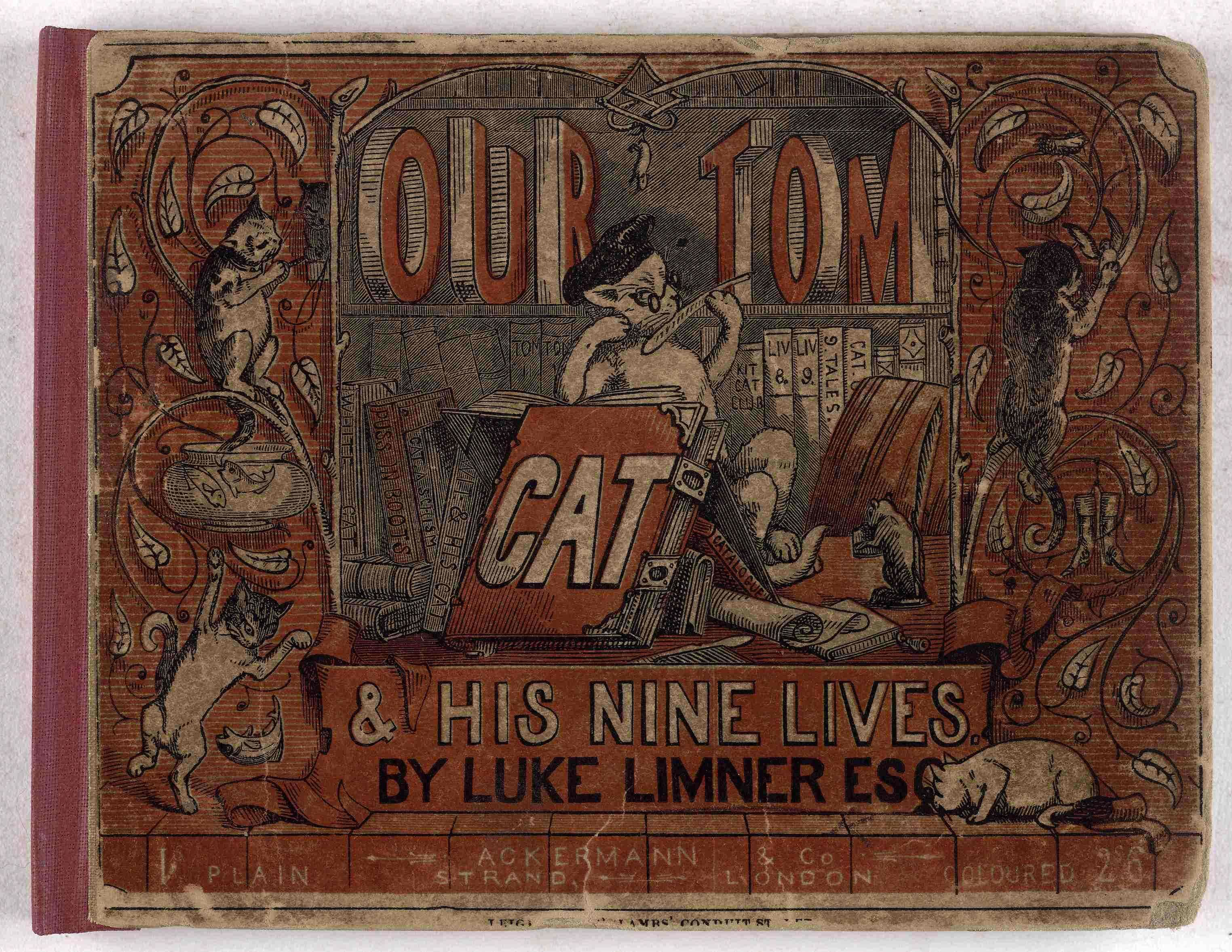
Our tom cat & his nine lives (1849)

Leighton was born in 6 Devfours Place, St James Westminster, Middlesex. He remained single for the majority of his life, living in an intergenerational household and working as an artist, primarily illustrations for Book covers, working under the pseudonym Luke Limner. His talent for design found early expression in the publication Suggestions in Design ... for the Use of Artists and Art Workmen (1852). This was a work that expounded Leighton's values and beliefs with regard to the history of design. He used the ornaments and designs repeatedly in the thirty years after its publication with regard to illustrations within books, and for many hundreds of drawings for book cover designs. In May 1863, he delivered a lecture On Japanese Art at The Royal Institution of Great Britain. He is buried in the Leighton family tomb in the churchyard of St Mary's Church, Harrow on the Hill, which he designed in 1867. His tomb was listed Grade II on the National Heritage List for England in April 2016.

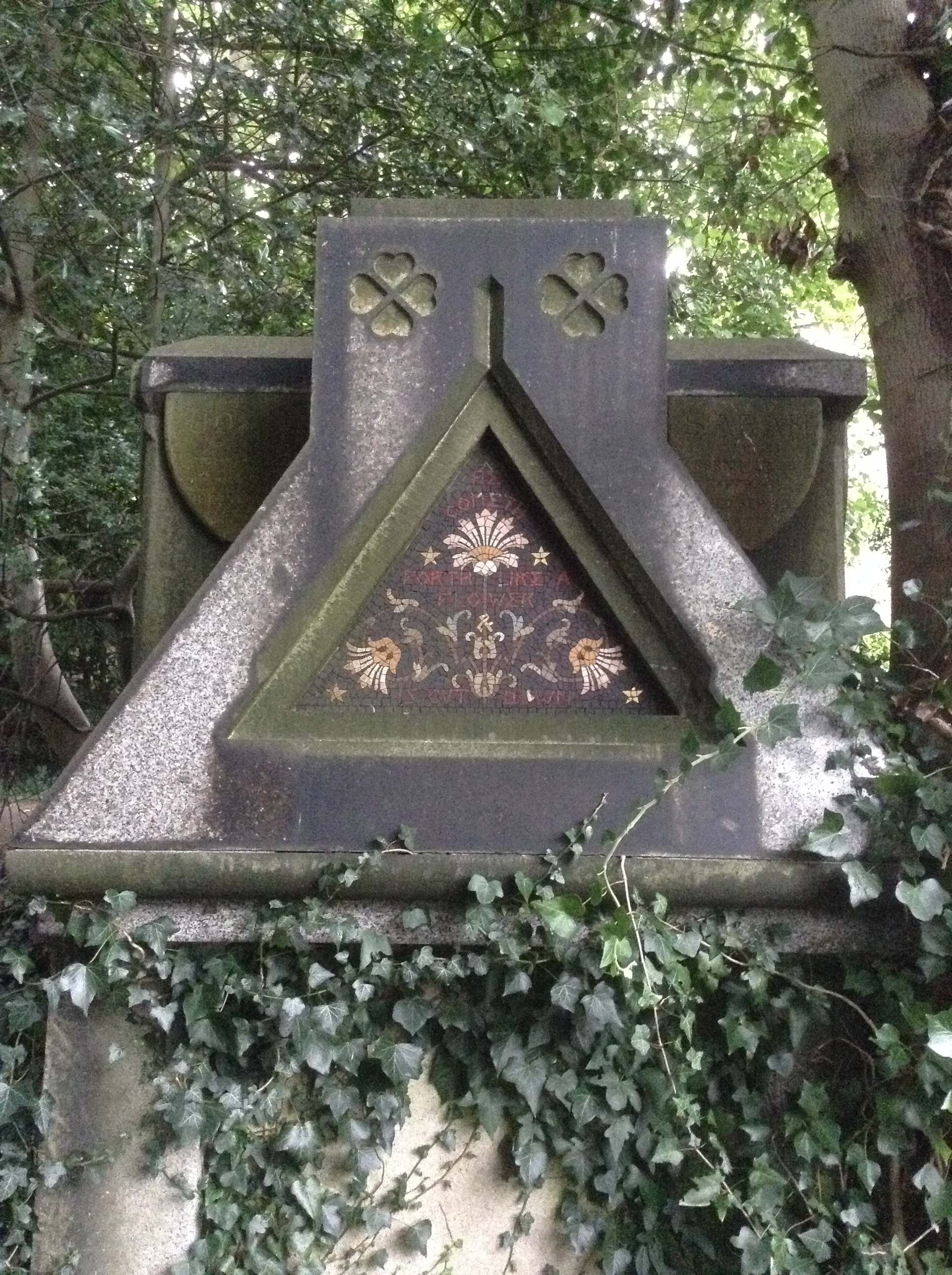
Leighton's tomb in the churchyard of St Mary's Church, Harrow on the Hill
