= The Guitar (painting) =

1912 oil on canvas still life painting by Georges Braque

The Guitar is an oil on canvas still life painting by French artist Georges Braque, from 1912. It was owned by the poet André Breton, from 1923 to 1943. It is now held in the Museum of Grenoble.
