= Still Life with Chair Caning =

Painting by Pablo Picasso

Still Life with Chair Caning is an ovular 1912 mixed-media collage work by Pablo Picasso (1881–1973), which is considered to be the first cubist collage as well as, by some, the first assemblage. The work consists of oil and printed oilcloth (a waterproof fabric used for tablecloths – here imitating the chair caning material, i.e., rattan) on canvas edged with rope. It is said that by introducing the facsimile of a newspaper into the work, he was "inserting a fragment of reality into the fictive realm of painting".

In this still life piece, the elements which go into a restaurant or café dining experience are the crux of the literal pictorial ingredients. It is one of the initial Synthetic Cubist collage works. ..."In these works, still-life objects overlap and intermingle, barely maintaining identifiable two-dimensional forms, losing individual surface texture, and merging into the background—achieving goals nearly opposite to those of traditional still life."

The work is held in the permanent collection of the Musée Picasso in Paris.
