= John Currie (artist) =

English painter

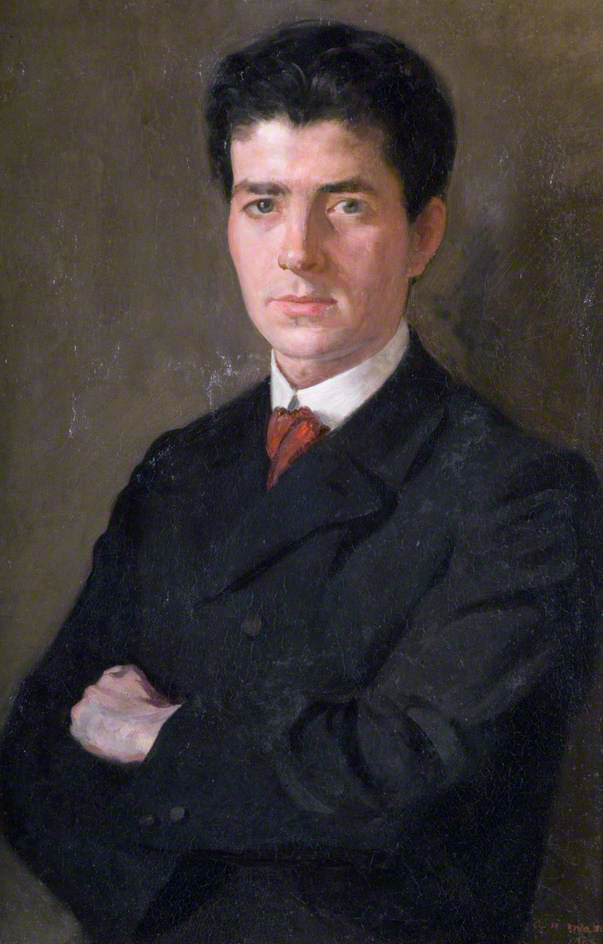
- Self portrait (1905)
- Born: c. 1884; Chesterton, Newcastle-under-Lyme, Staffordshire
- Died: 11 October 1914 (aged 29–30); Chelsea, London
- Education: Royal College of Art, Slade School of Fine Art
- Known for: painting
- Movement: Neo-primitivism

John Currie (c. 1884 – 11 October 1914) was an English painter and murderer. Born in Staffordshire, the illegitimate son of an Ulster-Scottish father who was a 'navvy' working on the railways and an English mother, he worked as an artist in the Potteries, painting ceramics, before going to the Royal College of Art in 1905, and later becoming Master of Life Painting at Bristol. He married in 1907. In the summer of 1910 he briefly attended the Slade School of Art, where he joined the 'Neo-Primitive' group that included fellow Slade students Mark Gertler, C.R.W. Nevinson, Edward Wadsworth, Stanley Spencer and Adrian Allinson. The contemporary art collector Michael Sadleir described him as 'blazing with genius'; others likened him to a character in a Dostoevsky novel.

Shortly before the start of World War I he travelled to France, painting for a time in Brittany. Currie had previously abandoned his wife and young son to begin a long and tempestuous affair with an attractive Irish model, Dolly Henry. (In full, Dorothy Eileen Henry, though sometimes written O'Henry). This ended with Currie shooting her dead at her Chelsea apartment; he then turned the gun on himself, and died in hospital a few days later. A fictionalized account of this event appears in Gilbert Cannan's 1916 novel Mendel. Currie's colleague, the French sculptor Henri Gaudier-Brzeska, remarked, 'He was a great painter, and a magnificent fellow.'

His work is to be found in the Tate Collection and Stoke-on-Trent Museums.

== Bibliography ==
- David Boyd Haycock, A Crisis of Brilliance: Five Young British Artists and the Great War (London: Old Street Publishing, 2009)
