= Aureliano de Beruete y Moret =

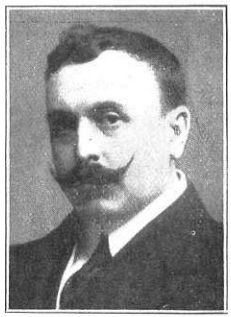
Aureliano de Beruete y Moret; Photograph by Kaulak (1915)

Aureliano de Beruete y Moret (1876, Madrid – 1922, Madrid) was an art critic and historian; son of the painter, Aureliano de Beruete. He served as Director of the Museo del Prado from 1918 until his death.

== Biography ==
As the son of a Professor who was a founding member of the Institución Libre de Enseñanza, he grew up being educated according to the pedagogical principles of Krausism, as did many Spanish intellectuals of the time. He obtained his doctorate in philosophy and literature at the Universidad Complutense de Madrid, and soon began to publish articles on art in several Spanish and foreign magazines. His essays and monographs included general subjects, such as The School of Madrid (1909), and studies of individual artists, such as Valdés Leal (1911), Velázquez en el Museo del Prado (1915), and Goya, pintor de retratos (1916).

In 1918, he succeeded José Villegas Cordero as Director of the Museo del Prado; becoming the first person who was not a painter to hold that position since the Duke of Híjar in 1838. During his tenure, he placed great importance on maintaining and updating catalogues of the museum's works, for which he created a cataloguing commission, composed of the art historians, Juan Allende-Salazar, Francisco Javier Sánchez Cantón and Pedro Beroqui Martínez (d.1955). Several international specialists also participated in the project. In 1919, he created display rooms dedicated to El Greco and Diego Velázquez. The following year, he convinced King Alfonso XIII to issue a decree, changing the museum's official name to the "Museo Nacional del Prado".

His tenure also saw the museum's first acquisition of a work through public subscription, and the occasion of its centenary (1919), which was celebrated quietly, with lectures, at the central gallery.

He inherited his father's passion for collecting art, coming to possess (among other treasures) the preparatory sketch for the "Libyan Sibyl" by Michelangelo, which is now in the Metropolitan Museum of New York. In 1921, he donated some of his father's works to the Museo de Arte Moderno (MAM), including a portrait of his mother, "Doña Teresa Moret, señora de Beruete". They were passed to the Prado when MAM closed in 1971.
