= Robert René Meyer-Sée =

French art dealer and critic (1884–1947)

- Born: 1884
- Died: After 1947
- Occupation: Art dealer
- Spouse: Grace Mercia Sibley

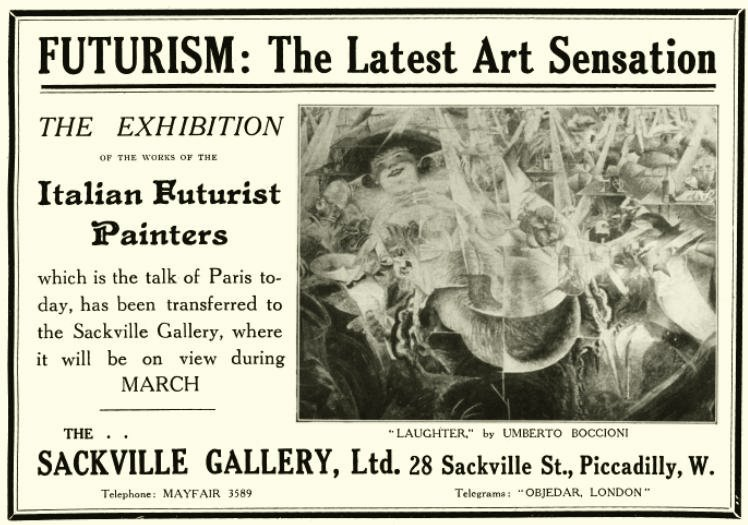
Advertising for the Sackville Gallery Futurist exhibition, 1912

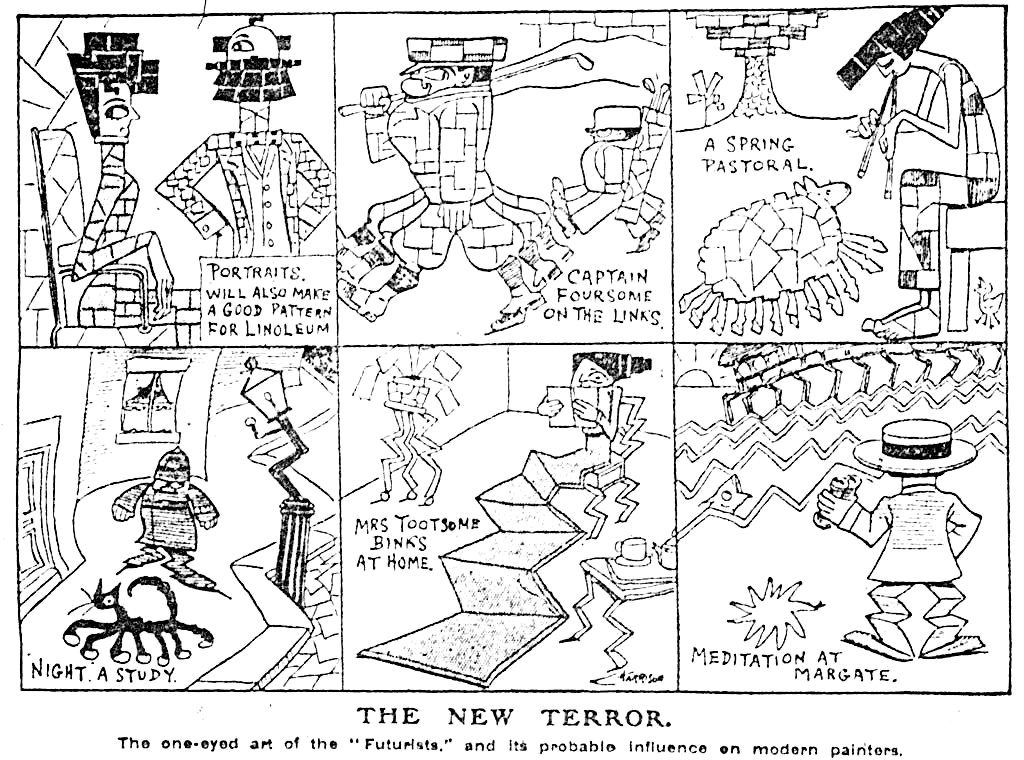
"The New Terror". Cartoon by Charles Harrison lambasting Futurist art. Daily Express, 4 March 1912.

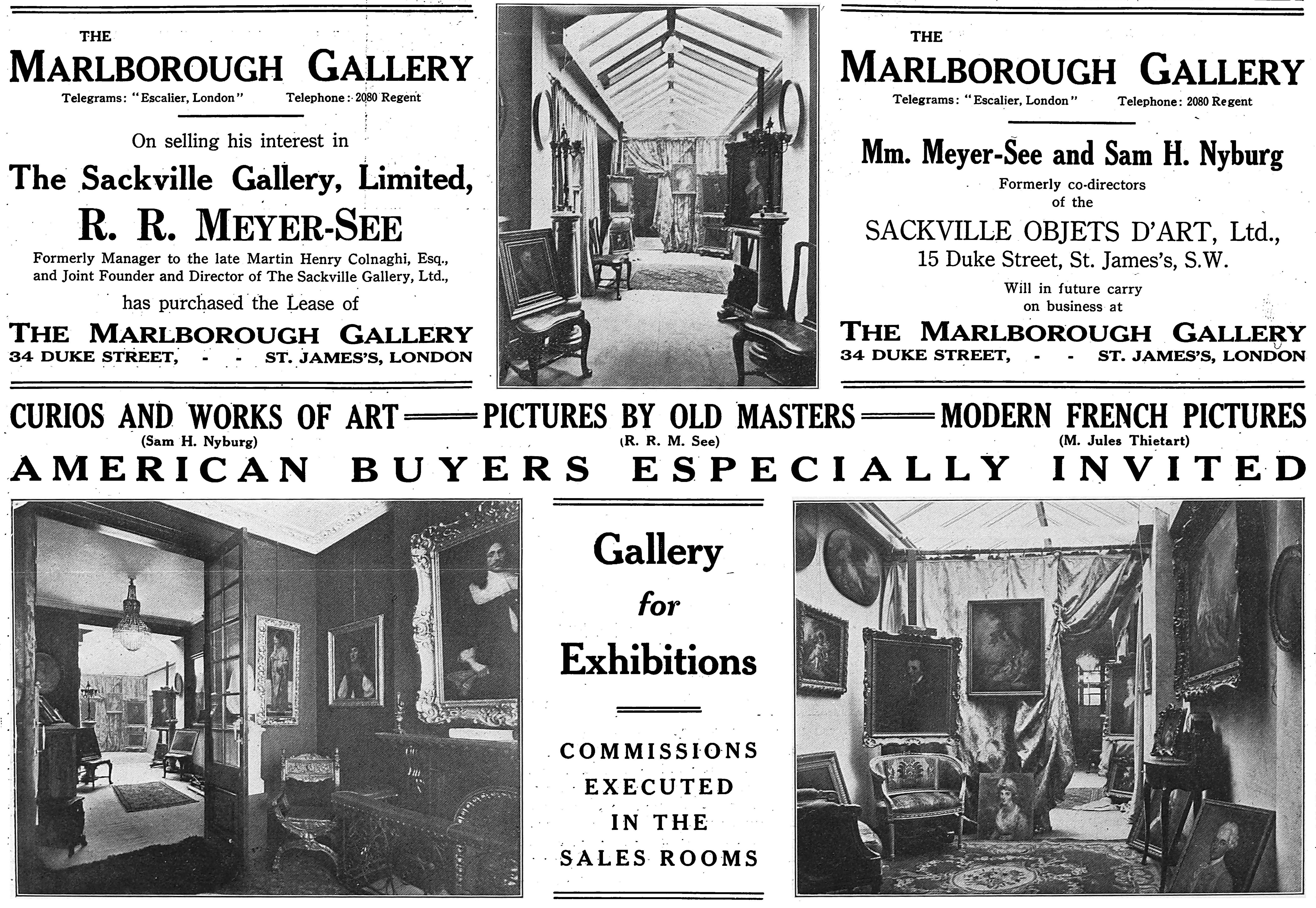
Advertising for the Marlborough Gallery, 1913

Gino Severini, Abstract rhythm of Mrs. M.S. (Ritmo astratto di Madame M.S.), 1915. Oil on canvas.

Robert René Meyer-Sée (1884 – after 1947) was a French art dealer and critic who was instrumental in organising the exhibition of Futurist painting at The Sackville Gallery in London in 1912. He ran the Marlborough Gallery where he organised an exhibition by the Italian Futurist Gino Severini, and was involved in a court case with an implication of fraud. Later, he moved to the United States.

== Early life and family ==
Meyer-Sée was born in Dijon, France, in 1884, the son of a viticulturist and wine merchant. He was educated at the Condorcet Lycee and the École des Hautes Études Sociales et Commerciales in Paris. He travelled to England in 1902. In 1905 he married Grace Mercia Sibley. At the time of his marriage, Meyer-Sée was described as a "motor salesman".

== London art galleries ==
Meyer-Sée worked as a manager for Martin Henry Colnaghi. After Colnaghi died, Meyer-Sée was a co-director, with Max Rothschild, at The Sackville Gallery, location of the 1912 Exhibition of the works of the Italian Futurist Painters, which he played a large part in organising. Meyer-Sée bought two Severini paintings from the show, Yellow Dancers (c. 1911–12) and The Boulevard (1910–11).

In August 1912, Meyer-Sée left The Sackville Gallery to run Rothschild's Marlborough Gallery at 34 Duke Street, London, along with his wife and Sam H. Nyburg. In April 1913 he organised an exhibition there by Gino Severini, one of the Futurists who had taken part in the 1912 exhibition. Severini lived with Meyer-Sée and his wife during the exhibition but there was tension over money and the titles given to the paintings. Severini wrote, "Sée is a pig and he is screwing me but I need him". Despite organising two exhibitions featuring Futurist art, Meyer-Sée was principally a dealer in old master paintings and not sympathetic to the Futurist aesthetic. Severini wrote to Filippo Marinetti, "I have to sustain our moral cause energetically since our friend Sée openly says he doesn’t give a damn."

== Grace Meyer-Sée ==
Grace Meyer-Sée, née Grace Mercia Sibley, was born in Australia. She claimed descent from the aristocratic Sibley-Braithwaites but there is no proof of this connection. Grace had an art collection in her own right which was sold in Paris in December 1912.

According to Barbara Pezzini, a possible source of tension in the Meyer-Sée household was Gino Severini's interest in Grace Meyer-Sée, who may have been the blonde woman that he had "almost decided to fall in love with" in 1911. In 1912 he painted Grace in a Cubo-Futurist style under the title Abstract rhythm of Mrs. M.S. (Ritmo astratto di Madame M.S.). He subsequently created a number of pastels of her and painted her again in oils in 1915. That work was sold at Sotheby's in February 2015 for £7,093,000.

The Mrs. M.S. series is considered to be the most important example of portraiture in Severini's work and reflected his belief that dynamism could be found in a static subject as much as in a racing car and the other exemplars of speed and modernity more typically found in the painting of the Futurists. A newspaper and book were added to the second version of the painting, provoking comparisons with the Cubist work of Juan Gris.

Severini later explained that as well as being a formal experiment in painting, the work reflected the "psychological relationship between the artist and the sitter". In April 1913, he wrote to Marinetti, "I am Sée's guest, I am guzzling his food and sleeping in his house (the organisation of his house is immense, grand); but this state of affairs cannot go on and I have to cross the Channel as soon as possible", adding revealingly, "Watching the blonde Madame Sée grow old is a pleasure; she is becoming ugly and sick of men".

== Fake bronzes ==
In 1913, Meyer-See gave an undertaking in court to the representatives of the French sculptor Auguste Rodin not to sell a bronze figure of a girl purporting to bear the signature of Rodin and which the sculptor claimed was a forgery. A number of bronzes claimed to be by Rodin had been circulated in England by François Bernascki, Pietro Toledo, and Bertrand Coureau who were similarly ordered not to dispose of them.

== Stolen pictures ==
Meyer-Sée served as an officer in the French army during the First World War. In 1916 he was involved in a court case over paintings stolen from the Marlborough Gallery, for which he returned from the front to give evidence. Appearing in court in uniform, Meyer-Sée claimed that over the night of 17/18 June 1915 a number of paintings with a value in excess of £3000 were stolen from the gallery. It was stated that the only person in the gallery that night was Mrs Meyer-Sée in the flat upstairs who, hearing noises and the dog barking, claimed she was too frightened to leave her room.

The police investigated and found no evidence of a burglary. A claim was subsequently made to the insurers at Lloyd's of London on a policy taken out on 18 June 1914. The insurers denied that there had been a burglary or that the paintings were lost, thus effectively accusing Meyer-Sée of fraud. Under cross-examination, Meyer-Sée accepted that he had been under financial pressure since the start of the war but denied that the stolen pictures were the best in the gallery as had been suggested. He had been in France at the time of the burglary. Of his creditors, he explained that one was French and was not fighting and "from the French point of view those who were fighting should not pay those who were not".

According to police investigations, there was a thick coating of dust on the window sill and on the glass roof to the gallery, indicating that entry had not been obtained to the property that way. It was suggested that someone might have concealed themselves in the building. Asked if she had been party to a fraud, Mrs Meyer-Sée replied that she wouldn't hurt a mouse, much less commit a fraud. In his ruling the Judge stated that he was satisfied there had been a burglary of the premises and found in favour of Robert Meyer-Sée but commented that the case was "mysterious".

== Writing ==
Until 1913, Meyer-Sée was the Paris correspondent for American Art News. Among the other journals he wrote for are Revue Artistique, The Connoisseur, Le Courrier graphique, Gazette des Beaux-Arts, Les Arts and Gil Blas.

== Later life ==
In the 1920s, Meyer-Sée moved to the United States. He catalogued the Xavier Haas collection at the Galerie Haas et Gross in Paris. His last writings appear to be in the 1940s but his date of death is unknown.

== Selected publications ==
- English Pastels 1750–1830. G. Bell & Sons, London, 1911.
- Masquerier and his Circle. The Connoisseur, London, 1922.

== See also ==
- Gilbert de Rorthays
