= Goldfish (Matisse) =

1912 painting by Henri Matisse

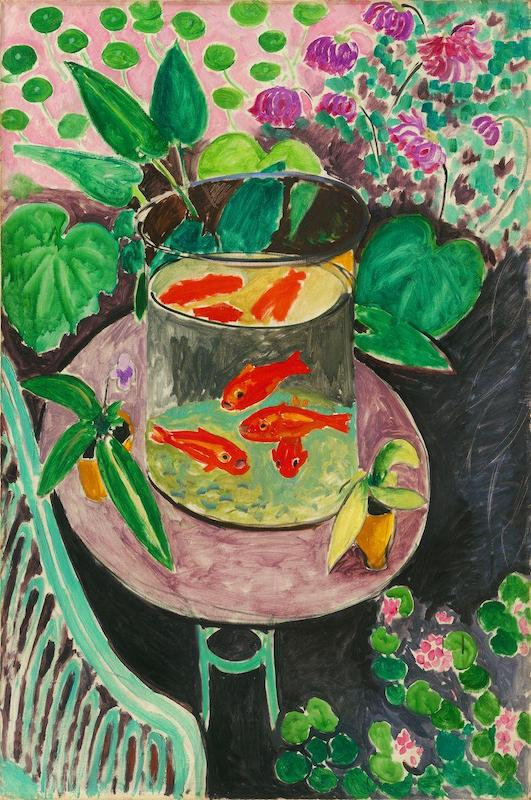
- Artist: Henri Matisse
- Year: 1912
- Medium: Oil on canvas
- Dimensions: 140 cm × 98 cm (55 in × 39 in)
- Location: Pushkin Museum; Moscow

Goldfish (French: Les Poissons rouges) is a 1912 oil-on-canvas still life painting by French visual artist Henri Matisse. Goldfish, whose centerpiece includes four goldfish, was part of a series that Matisse produced between the spring and early summer of 1912.

== Background ==
In the early 1900s, Matisse established himself as a leader of the Fauvism art movement. Fauvism emphasised a strong use of colour and painterly qualities, as opposed to realistic representations found in Impressionist art.

In 1912, Matisse visited Tangier, Morocco, where he noted how the locals would be fascinated by goldfish swimming in bowls.

Shortly after his visit to Morocco, Matisse produced a series of paintings that included Goldfish between the spring and early summer. Goldfish was painted in Matisse's garden conservatory at his home in Issy-les-Moulineaux. He moved there to escape the pressures of Paris.

The motif of fish in aquariums was notable in his work and would become a recurring sight from in the early and mid-1910s.

== Description and theme ==
The 1912 Goldfish painting was unlike other Matisse works featuring goldfish, as the four goldfish themselves are the focus of the piece. Matisse continued the use of bright colours found in his Fauvist work on Goldfish. The painting features a "bright orange [that] strongly contrasts with the more subtle pinks and greens that surround the fish bowl and the blue-green background."

A still life, the painting features "Matisse's own plants, his own garden furniture, and his own fish tank." Additionally, Matisse's "depiction of space" in the piece creates a tension. The goldfish can be seen from two different angles simultaneously: from the front, where the viewer can immediately recognise them, and from above, where they are "merely suggested by colorful brushstrokes."

Goldfish illustrates many common themes found in Matisse's paintings. The use of complementary colors, a trademark of Fauvism, is associated with many of his other works. Additionally, his exploration of an "idyllic paradise" and desire to invoke a "contemplative relaxation" for the viewer of the work.

== Provenance and legacy ==
The piece was purchased by Sergei Shchukin in Paris from Matisse's studio in 1912, and was a part of Shchukin's Pink Drawing Room ensemble in his home. Since 1948, the work has been located at the Pushkin Museum in Moscow, Russia. Goldfish holds the distinction of being the featured Matisse work found in the College Board's AP Art History curriculum.

== See also ==
- List of works by Henri Matisse
