= Rogelio de Egusquiza =

Spanish painter (1845–1915)

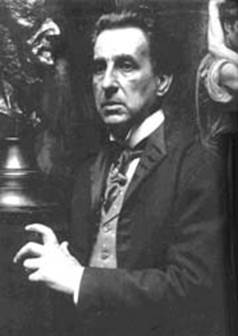
Rogelio de Egusquiza with a bust of Wagner

Rogelio de Egusquiza y Barrena (1845 – 10 February 1915) was a Spanish painter, known for his friendship with the German composer Richard Wagner, whose works he helped make familiar in Spain.

== Biography ==
Egusquiza was born in El Astillero, into a well-to-do family. He studied in Madrid and with Léon Bonnat at the École des Beaux-Arts in Paris. In 1868, after travelling and participating several times in the National Exhibition of Fine Arts, he returned to Paris and settled there. At first, he painted historical scenes, but later turned to genre scenes and portraits in the Academic style.

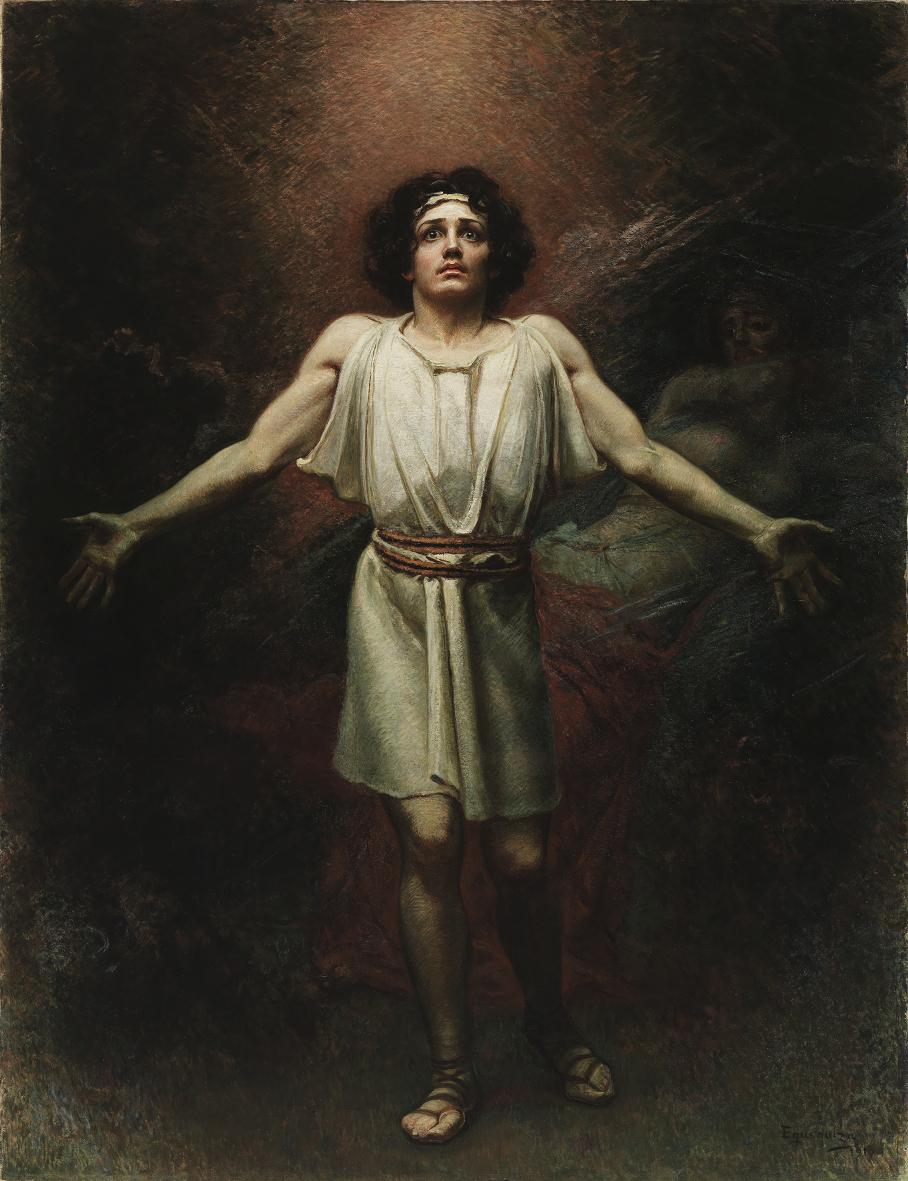
Parsifal

Following the death of Marià Fortuny, he moved to Rome at the invitation of the Madrazos, Raimundo and Ricardo, taking Fortuny's place at their studio through 1875 and attending classes at the Spanish Academy in Rome.

He heard Wagner's music for the first time in 1876, after returning to Paris. Three years later, he travelled to Munich to hear a performance of The Ring of the Nibelungen. His enthusiasm for what he heard led him to go to Bayreuth, where he introduced himself to Wagner and became his friend. In the following years, he and Wagner got together again several times: in Venice (1880), Berlín (1881), and Bayreuth (1882), where he was a guest at the premiere of Parsifal.

After his first meeting with Wagner, he decided to devote his career to doing works on Wagnerian themes, mostly portraits of the characters rather than specific scenes. During his visits to Germany, he also created portraits of Arthur Schopenhauer (posthumous) and King Ludwig II of Bavaria and wrote an article for the newsletter Bayreuther Blätter called "Über die Beleuchtung der Bühne" (On Stage Lighting).

He participated in the Salons de la Rose + Croix in 1892, 1893, 1896 and 1897, and presented prints from Parsifal at the Exposition Universelle (1900), winning a silver medal. Although he lived in Paris, he was a frequent visitor to Madrid and was part of a circle of Wagnerian admirers that met at the Lhardy restaurant.

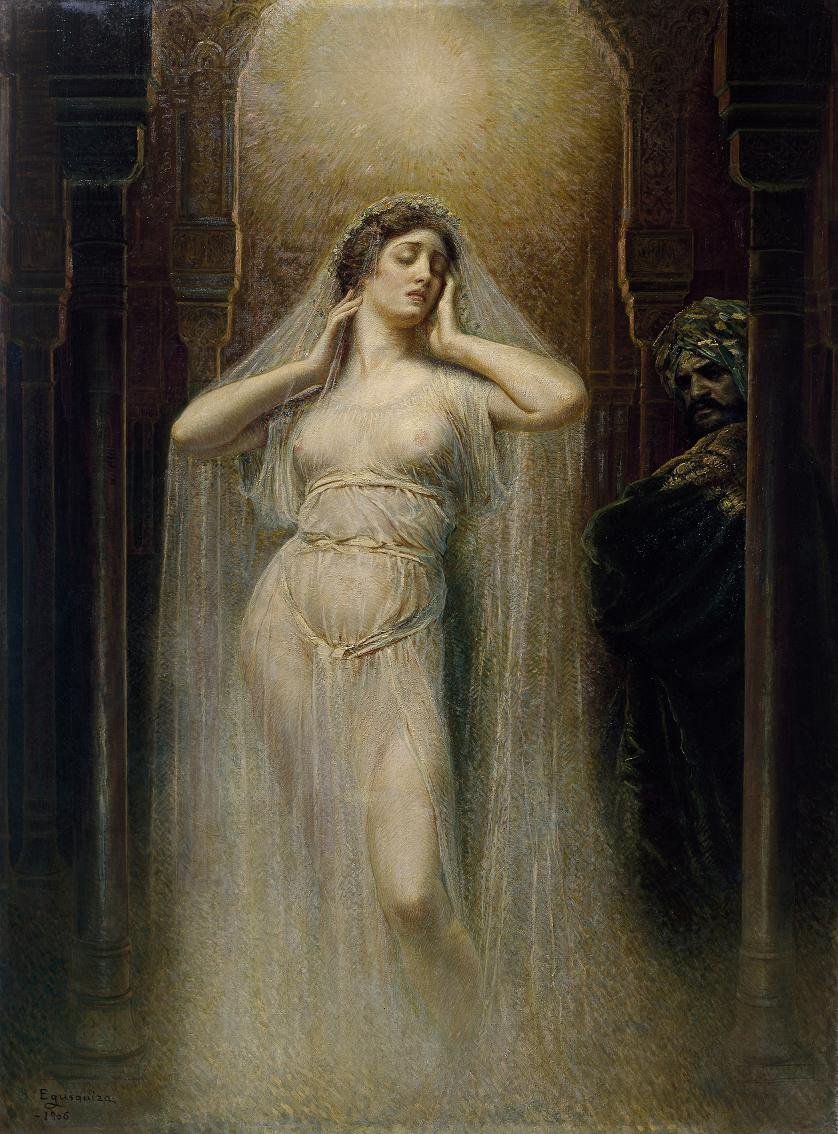
Kundry

When the "Asociación Wagneriana de Madrid" was established in 1911, he presented them with copies of voice and piano versions of several operas and one hundred etchings of his portrait of Wagner (based on a familiar photograph), to be sold to benefit the association. Later, he was made an honorary member.

He remained in Paris until 1914, when World War I forced him to return to Spain. He died in Madrid the following year. From 2013 to 2014, in celebration of Wagner's 200th birthday, the Museo del Prado presented an exhibition of Egusquiza's works called "El Mal se desvanece" (Evil fades), which included several portraits of classical literary figures as well as his Wagnerian works.
