= Zorah on the Terrace =

Painting by Henri Matisse

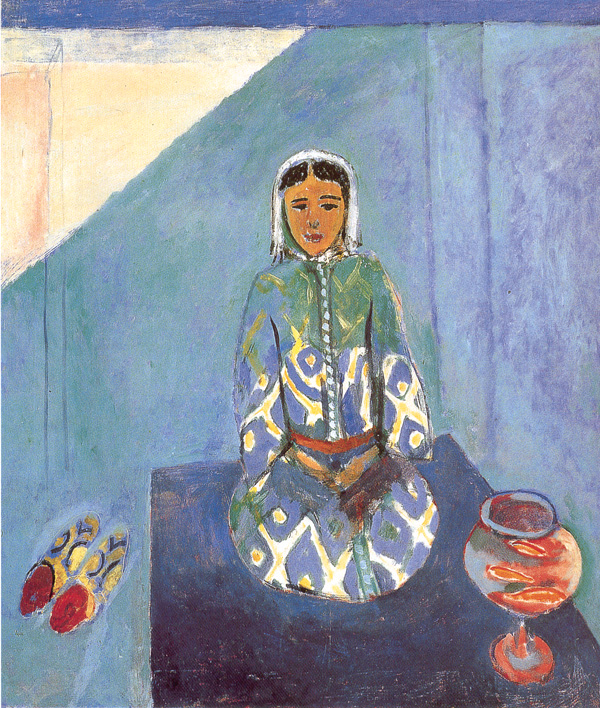
Zorah on the Terrace, 1912, oil on canvas, 116 x 100 cm., The Pushkin Museum of Fine Arts, Moscow, Russia

Zorah on the Terrace is an oil on canvas painting by French painter Henri Matisse, created in 1912. It is in the collection of the Pushkin Museum of Fine Arts, Moscow, Russia.

This work is the portrait of a young Moroccan woman from Tangier, crouching on a carpet in the shade of the walls bordering a terrace, with a bowl of goldfish next to her. Part of a set sometimes called the Moroccan Triptych, this work belonged to the collection of Ivan Morozov until 1919. It is held at the Pushkin Museum of Fine Arts, in Moscow, since 1948.

== See also ==
- Henri Matisse and goldfish
- List of works by Henri Matisse
