= Cydalise et le Chèvre-pied =

Two-act ballet

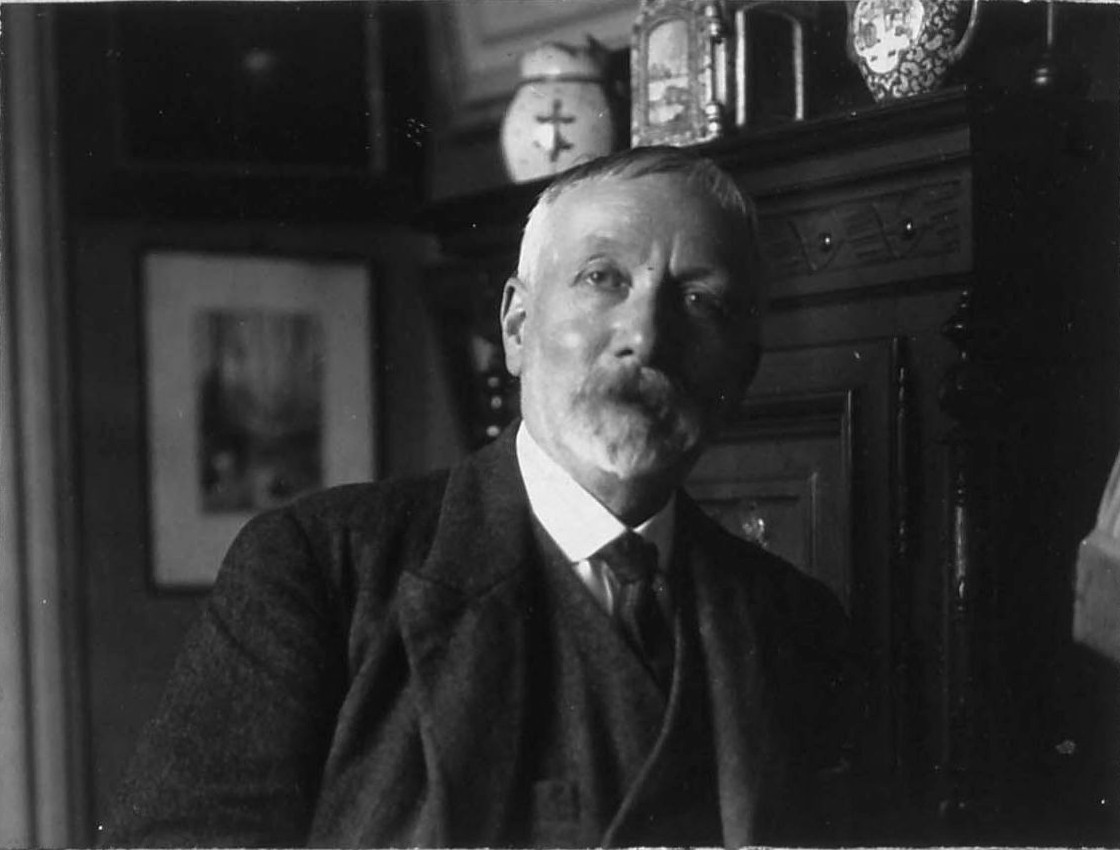
Gabriel Pierné in 1925

Cydalise et le chèvre-pied ("Cydalise and the goat-foot" or "Cydalise and the satyr") is a two-act ballet originally choreographed by Léo Staats to a score by Gabriel Pierné. The libretto was written by Gaston Arman de Caillavet and Robert de Flers, based on Remy de Gourmont's Lettre d'un satyre. Though it was composed between 1914 and 14 February 1915, its Paris Opera premiere was delayed due to the conditions of World War I until 15 January 1923. The use of the French term "chèvre-pied" (goat foot) to refer to the satyr is distinct to this composition.

The ballet remains one of the Pierné's most popular compositions. The music is of the impressionist era, though it contains elements of Romanticism, Neoclassicism, and Neo-Baroque music. Three years after the premiere Pierné extracted two suites from the work, the first of which includes sections from the first two tableaux while the second comprises the entire third tableau. One of the most recognizable pieces in the ballet, "L'École des Ægipans," also known as "The Entry of the Little Fauns" or "The March of the Fauns," is occasionally excerpted and performed separately.

== The music ==
=== Structure ===
==== Act I ====
Tableau I

- Introduction
- Danse des Dryades
- Apparition de la Source
- L'École des Ægipans
- La Leçon de flûte de Pan
- L'École des Nymphes
- La Leçon de danse
- Scène
- Styrax

==== Act II ====
Tableau II

- Entrée des Danseurs
- Entrée de Styrax
- Entrée de Cydalise
- Ballet La Sultane des Indes
  - Entrée
  - Pantomime
  - Pas des Apothicaires
  - Danse des Esclaves
  - Variations de Cydalise
  - Final du Ballet
- Danse de Styrax

Tableau III

- Entrée de Cydalise
- Entrée des Suivantes
- Pas des billets doux
- Entrée de Styrax et danse
- Final

=== Style and influences ===
Cydalise et le Chèvre-pied makes use of modes and lush harmonies characteristic of impressionist music. The opening moonrise scene, highlighted by a wordless chorus, uses techniques similar to that of Maurice Ravel's Daphnis et Chloé (1912). Cydalise, however, differs in its adherence to shorter musical numbers and closed form composition. The ballet also references styles customary to the Classical and Baroque musical eras, employing a magnified woodwind section emphasizing flutes and piccolos, and even a contemporaneously uncommon use of the harpsichord in Act II.

== Discography ==
- 1976: Orchestra suites no. 1 and 2 (+ Ramuntcho), performed by the Paris Opera, Jean-Baptiste Mari (dir.) - EMI Classics.
- 2001: Cydalise et le Chèvre-pied, performed by the Luxembourg Philharmonic Orchestra, David Shallon (dir.) - Timpani Records.

== In popular culture ==
Cydalise et le Chèvre-pied was among Toccata and Fugue in D minor, Nutcracker Suite, Night on Bald Mountain, Ave Maria, Dance of the Hours, Clair de Lune, The Rite of Spring, and The Sorcerer's Apprentice as the original planned line-up for Walt Disney's Fantasia (1940). However, both it and Clair de Lune were removed from the program late in the writing process and Cydalise et le Chèvre-pied was ultimately replaced with sections from Ludwig van Beethoven's Pastoral Symphony.

== Sources ==
- Gabler, Neal (2008). Walt Disney: The Biography. Aurum Press Ltd. ISBN 978-1-84513-342-9.
