= Paysage marocain (Acanthes) =

Painting by Henri Matisse

Paysage marocain (Acanthes) Moroccan Landscape (Acanthus)
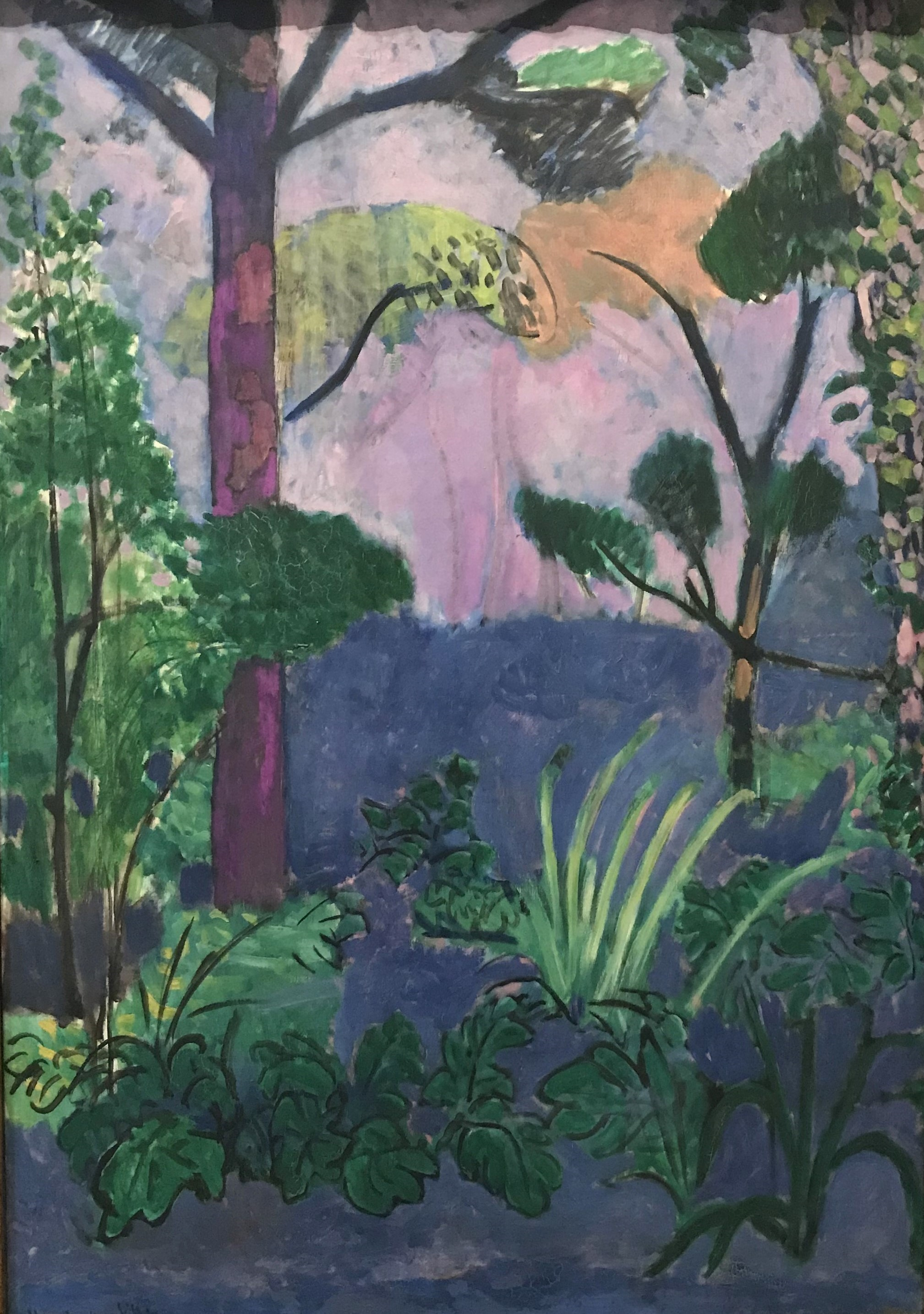
- Artist: Henri Matisse
- Year: 1912
- Medium: Oil on canvas
- Movement: Fauvism
- Dimensions: 115 cm × 80 cm (45 in × 31 in)
- Location: Moderna museet; Stockholm

Paysage marocain (Acanthes), also known as Moroccan Landscape (Acanthus), is an oil painting from 1912 by the French artist Henri Matisse. The painting is signed "Henri Matisse" in the lower left corner and has been in the collection of the Moderna museet in Stockholm since 1917.

Matisse spent the winter of 1911 and 1912 in Morocco, inspired by a major exhibition of Islamic art he had seen in Munich in 1910. He returned to Morocco the following winter and afterwards claimed that "my Moroccan travels helped me make the necessary transition. They also gave a closer contact with Nature than was possible if I continued to apply the vigorous yet limited theory that Fauvism had become". The Moroccan landscape looked exactly as Matisse had imagined after seeing the Romantic painter Eugène Delacroix’s scenes from Morocco, and reading Pierre Loti’s Travel Memoir Au Maroc.

During his first Moroccan visit he spent six weeks in the vast park of the Villa Bronx in Tangier. After weeks of pouring rain, the sun brought the light he had been looking for. In the Paysage marocain (Acanthes) the ground is blue on pink, and overgrown with blooming acanthus leaves. Matisse wanted to channel the inner expressive capacity of colours, like the dripping humidity, growth and inner force conveyed in this painting.

At the Villa Bronx Matisse began painting three identically sized pictures that can be seen as a triptych. In addition to the Moroccan Landscape (Acanthus) it consists of Moroccan Garden (Periwinkles) (private collection) and Palm Leaf, Tangier (National Gallery of Art). In Western art, triptychs are associated with religious art such as altarpieces. Marcel Sembat, a French deputy and Matisse collector, wrote in his Matisse monograph that these three garden paintings represent a kind of transfiguration that comes close to a religious spirit.

== See also ==
- List of works by Henri Matisse
