= Felician Myrbach =

Austrian painter, graphic designer and illustrator

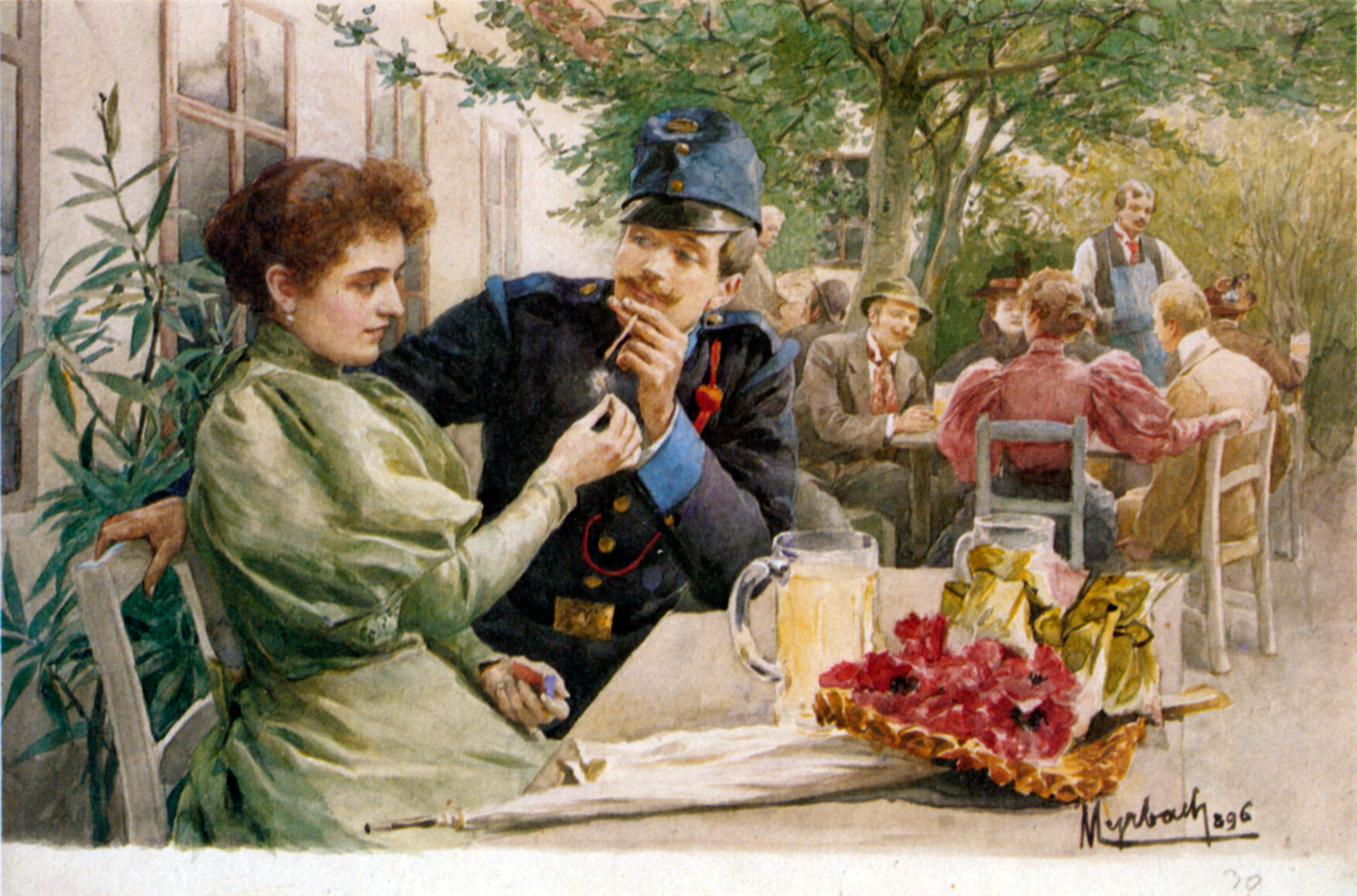
In the tavern garden (1896)

Felician Myrbach (also Felicien de Myrbach, Felician von Myrbach, from 1919 Freiherr von Rheinfeld; 19 February 1853, Zalishchyky – 14 January 1940, Klagenfurt) was an Austrian painter, graphic designer and illustrator. He was a founding member of the Vienna Secession and the director of the Applied Arts School in Vienna (now the University of Applied Arts Vienna), and was instrumental in the creation of the Wiener Werkstätte.

== Life ==
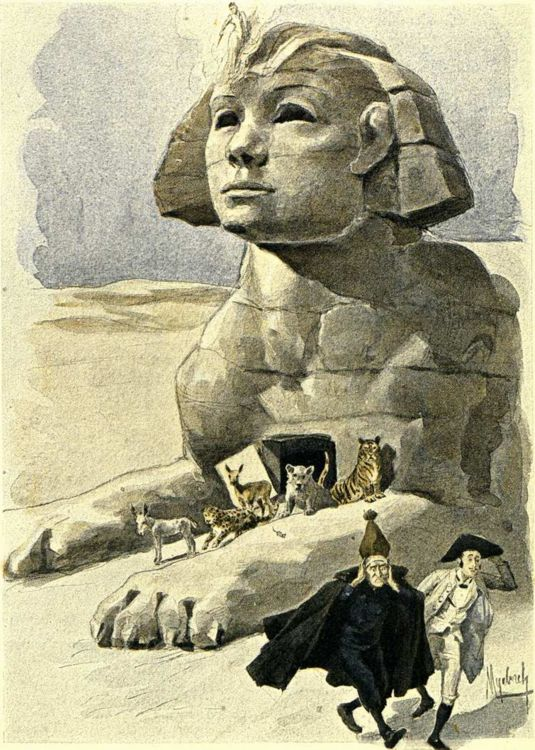
Illustration from Jules Verne's short story Aventures de la famille Raton (1891)

Myrbach's father was Franz Myrbach (1818–1882), the Administrator of Bukovina in 1865–70. His older brother Franz Xaver (1850–1919) was an economist and professor at the University of Innsbruck. He attended the Theresian Military Academy in 1868–71, graduating as a Leutnant, then at the Academy of Fine Arts, Vienna under August Eisenmenger. In 1875, he joined the 19th Feldjäger Battalion, and in 1877 became an Oberleutnant in the Military Geographic Institute, then, after campaigning in Bosnia in 1878, he taught drawing at the Infantry Cadet School in Vienna. He continued his artistic studies under C R Huber. In 1881, he went on military leave and moved to Paris, retiring totally from the military in 1884 as a Hauptmann, 2nd Class. He stayed in Paris until 1897, illustrating the works of Alphonse Daudet, Victor Hugo, Jules Verne and Pierre Loti (including the famous first edition of Madame Chrysanthème).

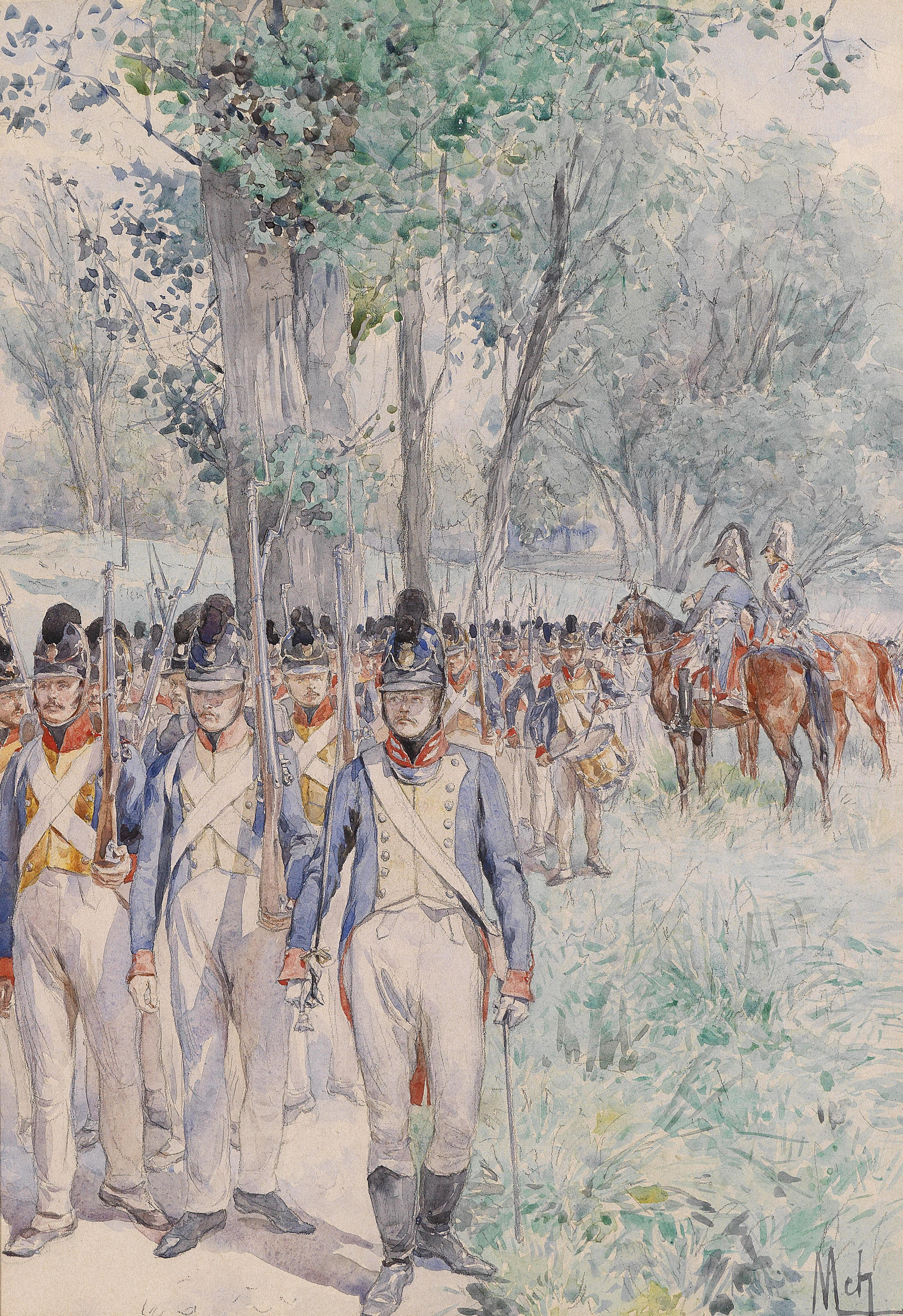
Marching regiment

Myrbach was a founding member of the Vienna Secession in 1897. In the same year, he became the a professor of the Applied Arts School at the Museum of Art and Industry; Arthur von Scala, another reformer Modernist, was made head of the Museum. In 1889, Myrbach became the director of the school. He brought an enthusiastic Modernist attitude and encouraged an integration between art, design and production. He added Koloman Moser and Josef Hoffmann to the staff, amongst other Secession artists. This would lead to the foundation of the Wiener Werkstätte in 1903. Myrbach leant more towards an aesthetic approach than von Scala, but both worked together to bring about their combined vision of successful, popular Austrian applied art. Myrbach was a voice for reform towards Modernist ideals in the School, which was started 1899 with the support of Alfred Roller, and completed by 1901. The reform of the school has been described as his "lasting merit".

In his teaching capacity at the School, Myrbach taught Alfred Gerstenbrand, Hans Strohoffer, Wilhelm Schmidt, Walter Dittrich, Karl Thiemann and Walter Klemm; he also ran schools for women, including Stephanie Glax and Sophie Korner. Orientalist ideas like Japanese ise-katagami stencils were included in the curriculum. He was a pioneer of lithography in Vienna and taught it at the School, to Hermine Ostersetz among others.

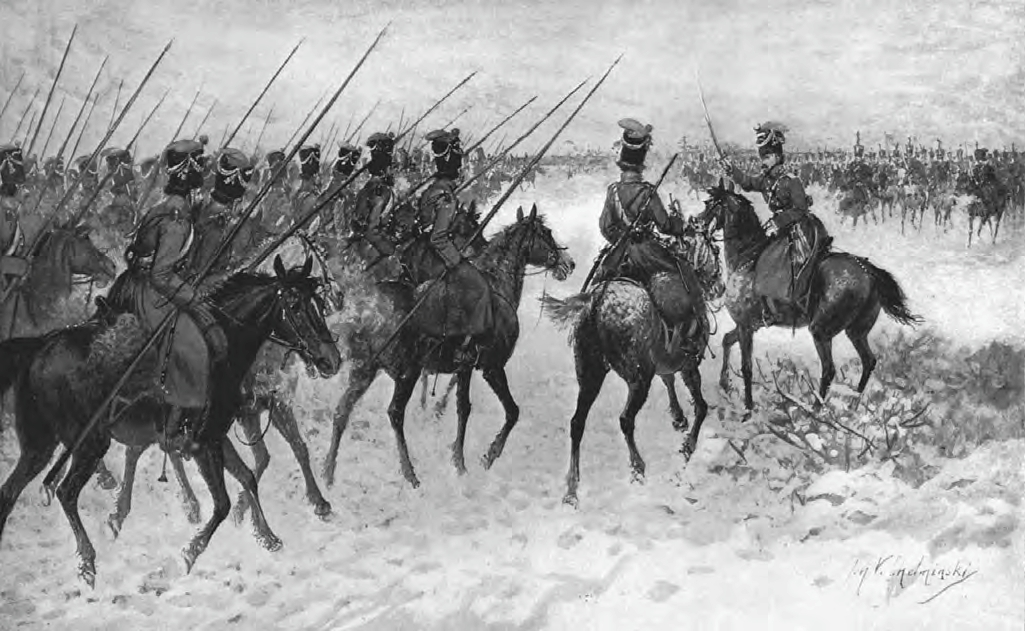
Cossacks, from Life of Napoleon Bonaparte (1906)

Myrbach was elected to the Secession's committee in 1899, contributed mosaics for the 1902 Beethoven Exhibition, and served as the Secession's president in 1903. He was close to Gustav Klimt, and was part of the 'Klimt Group' that left the Secession in 1905. Ludwig Hevesi called Myrbach "probably the best [illustrator] in Vienna", partially for his work (with Moser) in the Secession magazine Ver Sacrum.

Myrbach visited America on a state-funded study trip in 1904, part of which was to represent the Applied Arts School at the 1904 World's Fair in St Louis; from California, he submitted his resignation to the school due to ill health. He moved abroad in 1905, first returning to Paris and providing illustrations for Hachette, and then from 1914 living in Spain, mainly in Barcelona but also spent time in Bilbao. He returned to Austria in 1936.

Myrbach created many scenes of military life, as well as bucolic pictures of farmers, horses and forests; as well, his work showed touches of Orientalism. Until 1898, he employed algraphy in his work; he painted in oil, watercolour and tempera.

== Selected exhibitions ==
- Gallery of Modern Artists, Paris, 1885.
- 1889 World's Fair, Paris.
- Artaria & Co salon, Vienna, 1895.
- 4th Exhibition of the Vienna Secession, 1899, showing Hurrah.
- 10th Exhibition of the Vienna Secession, 1901, showing Farmhouse.
- 13th Exhibition of the Vienna Secession, 1902, showing Pinetrees.
- Düsseldorf, 1902, showing decorative mosaics.
- 42nd Exhibition of the Royal Watercolour Society, Belgium.
- 20th Exhibition of the Vienna Secession, 1904, showing Adam and Eve.
