= Ramuntcho =

French novel by Pierre Loti (1897)

Ramuntcho (1897) is a novel by French author Pierre Loti. It is a love and adventure story about contraband runners in the Basque province of France. It is one of Loti's most popular stories—"love, loss and faith remain eternal themes"—with four French film adaptations. It was first published in 5 parts, from 15 December 1896 to 15 February 1897, in the Revue de Paris. Calmann-Lévy published the novel in two parts on 10 March 1897. A dramatized version was staged in Paris in 1910, with incidental music by Gabriel Pierné.

== Characters and places ==
The novel is notable for its documentary description of French Basque culture.

=== Characters ===
- Ramuntcho. The bastard son of Franchita (father unknown), he struggles to be an accepted member of Basque society in the village of Etchezar. An accomplished pelota player and smuggler.
- Franchita. Mother of Ramuntcho, she has a mysterious and possibly scandalous past.
- Ignatio. Franchita's oldest brother (Ramuntcho's uncle) who lives in the Americas.
- Gracieuse Detcharry (also Gatchutcha and Mary Angelique). Ramuntcho's beautiful blonde girlfriend.
- Dolores Detcharry. Gracieuse's mother.
- Arrochkoa Detcharry. Brother of Gracieuse. Friend of Ramuntcho, accomplished pelota player and smuggler.
- Pantchika Daraignaratz. Blonde girl engaged to Arrochkoa. Mother is "Madame."
- Olhagarray. Cousins of Madame Daraignaratz who live in Erribiague.
- Itchola. Leader of the band of smugglers, he is older and hardened.
- Florentiono. Ramuntcho's friend and fellow smuggler. Red hair.
- Marcos and Joachim Iragola. Two brothers who are renowned singers and lyricists. Members of the band of smugglers.
- Jose Bidegarray, mysterious stranger who brings tidings from Ignatio in the Americas.

=== Places and things ===
- Etchezar. Town in Basque France where the story mainly takes place. (Sare and Ascain in the original manuscript)
- Bidasoa river that separates Spain and France. The smugglers often cross it at night.
- Gizune Mountain that dominates the landscape of Etchezar.
- Erribiague, a neighboring village higher up the mountain and more primitive.
- Amezqueta, a distant village where the nunnery is located.
- Pelota, an ancient Basque game played with a ball and wicker glove against the side of a church wall.
- Kalsomine, a white-wash used to cover stone buildings and walls.
- Mantilla, a head-dress often worn by Spanish women.
- Fandango, a favorite Spanish dance with castanets.

== Screen adaptations ==
- Ramuntcho (1919 film), short silent French subject by Jacques de Baroncelli.
- Ramuntcho (1938 film), French film by René Barberis.
- The Marriage of Ramuntcho, a 1947 French film by Max de Vaucorbeil.
- Ramuntcho (1959 film), French film by Pierre Schoendoerffer.

== Background ==
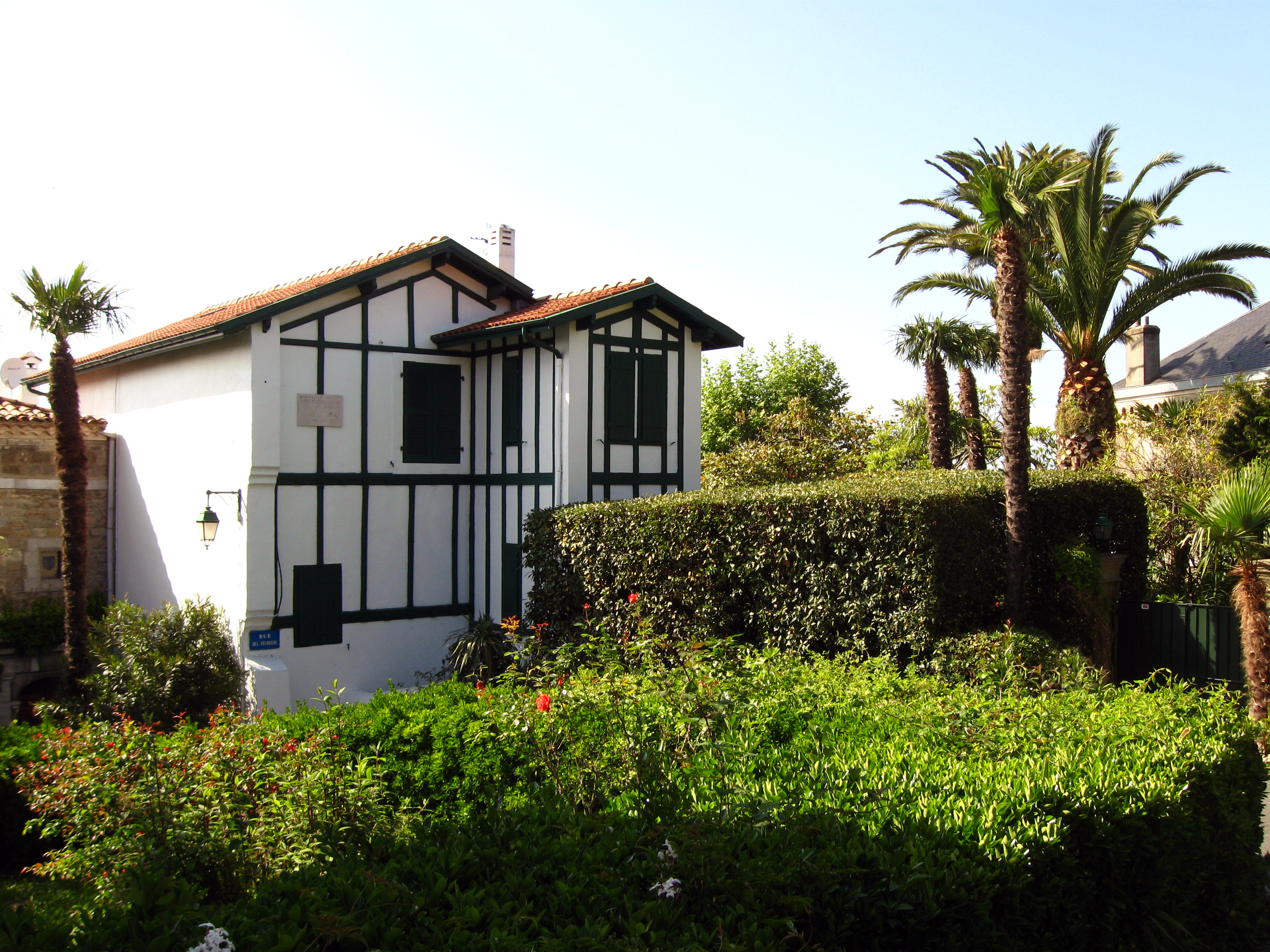
Loti took command of a gunboat in December 1891, at Hendaye, and the novel Ramuntcho was born of his encounter with the Basque country. Hendaye became a place he felt destined for him.

In December 1891 Julien Viaud (Loti) took command at Hendaye of Javelot, a gunboat charged with watching the French-Spanish border at the mouth of the Bidassoa, an area where smuggling was particularly prevalent. In the first months it appeared to him a colourless place, as his diary of the time indicated, but then its charm worked upon him, to the point where he wanted to buy the house he was renting. He gave it a Basque name Bakhar-Etchéa – it became the symbolic opposite of the old family home in Rochefort where his mother and father lived.

Two years after his arrival in the Basque country, his diary noted the start of the writing of the novel:

Tuesday 1 November 1893. – A calm, clear, bright and chilly day. A great melancholy of dead leaves, dead things... In the solitude of my study I conceived the plan and began to write Ramoncho, which will perhaps be the great thing I shall turn towards, against the infinite sadnesses of this winter...

At this point Loti was about to become only an episodic visitor to the Basque country so his diary, already filled with impressions and anecdotes was used almost without modification in the novel.

The novel was written as much in Rochefort as in the Basque country, to which Loti made trips however in 1894 and 1895, before returning to his post on the Javelot in May 1896. From February to June 1894 Loti visited the Holy Land "from which he returned as atheist as before he had set out". In 1894 too, he met Crucita Gainza (1867–1949) a Spanish Basque, a dancer and dressmaker, and installed her at his home in Rochefort. On 26 November 1893 he had written in his diary that he came to the Basque country:

to re-create life. To choose a young woman who might be the mother of my children, to transmit me, prolong me, re-start in me the mystery of new incarnations and I feel myself full of will, of force, of youth..

In October 1894 he learned that Crucita was pregnant and wrote that he dreamt of "this little Basque who will be born of us.." Their child was born on 29 June 1895. She gave him 3 illegitimate children (1895–1900).

== Themes ==
According to the French critic Patrick Besnier, (introducing a 1990 edition of the novel), Loti's book is one "shaped by the rapports between father and son – their non-existence, their impossibility.."

In Ramuntcho the Basque country is presented as a quasi-paradisiacal land. Time and history do not weigh upon this Arcadie, the slow passage of days and months is simply a succession of feast days and of rejoicing. The outside world doesn't intrude, even military service is left hazy – the reader learns only that Ramuntcho departs for "a southern land". From this Basque paradise, Ramuntcho is going to be excluded; the novel is the story of a fall, and of an exile from Eden. Unwilling at first to do his military service: "Non, je peux ne pas le faire, mon service! je suis Guipuzcoan, moi, comme ma mère;...Français ou Espagnol, moi, ça m'est égal.."

Yet he does his service, to please Gracieuse, and he chooses a nationality, French.

To the lack of differentiation French/Spanish, other themes of borders emerge – for example the border between adulthood and adolescence. According to Besnier, Loti, in his Basque life,

lived protected from the realities and cruelties of existence, and in a state of perpetual adolescence. In this happy land, it seems only games and pleasures exist, the two principal occupations being pelota and dancing, and the only 'work' really evoked, smuggling, which itself is a kind of game between police and thieves.

When Ramuntcho returns, having symbolically exchanged the 'pantalon rouge' of the military, for the 'tenues légères' of the players of pelota, he is changed. Even those amongst his comrades who have become fathers, continue to participate in their world as before, but not Ramuntcho.

The sentiment of exclusion from paradise which begins for the hero was one Loti knew. Lost childhood obsessed the writer, he was an exile in the world of adults where he would never truly integrate himself, neither able to take it seriously, nor to conquer the anxiety which it inspired in him. He wanted to ensorcerize it..to live in a universe of a manufactured adolescence..[witness] his celebrated taste for dressing up and costume balls, disguising reality, of which so many photographs give proof – Loti as a Pharaoh, Loti as Louis XI, Loti as a Berber.

Time and again in his life Loti travels to a land of possible salvation, that he thinks might know the secret of primitive innocence – time and again follows disillusion, and the traveller understands that, far from him being saved, rather he has brought contagion ('progress', 'civilization') to the dreamed of paradise.

In the Basque country too, Loti tried to find his paradise; he learnt to play pelota and began learning the Basque language. He was gendarme, yet wanted to join the smugglers in their expeditions – he had a hatred for all 'official masks'.

A story of rustic games, and with an innocent character, the novel seems to belong in a certain tradition which blossomed at the end of the eighteenth century – the idyllic pastoral novel – works like Jean-Pierre Claris de Florian's Estelle et Némorian or, best known of all, Bernardin de Saint Pierre's Paul et Virginie. The characteristics: young lovers, inexperienced, a mix of naive sensuality and chastity, an exaltation of simple life and frugal ways, a timeless world enclosing one, a beautiful and beneficent Nature, seem to appear again, a hundred years later, in Loti's work. But the critic Patrick Besnier has argued that more than the idyll, Ramuntcho belongs in the Bildungsroman tradition, to the novel of apprenticeship and of formation.

The title is significant. One name. This is Daphnis without Chloe, Paul without Virginie. Ramuntcho is alone. It is the painful story of a birth. And the novel about love in beautiful natural surroundings is only a stage, an appearance of this book, a dark and tragic book..

The apprenticeship is a series of ruptures and of renunciations so that on the last page Ramuntcho appears as une plante déracinée du cher sol basque.
