= Luigi Rossi (painter) =

Italian painter

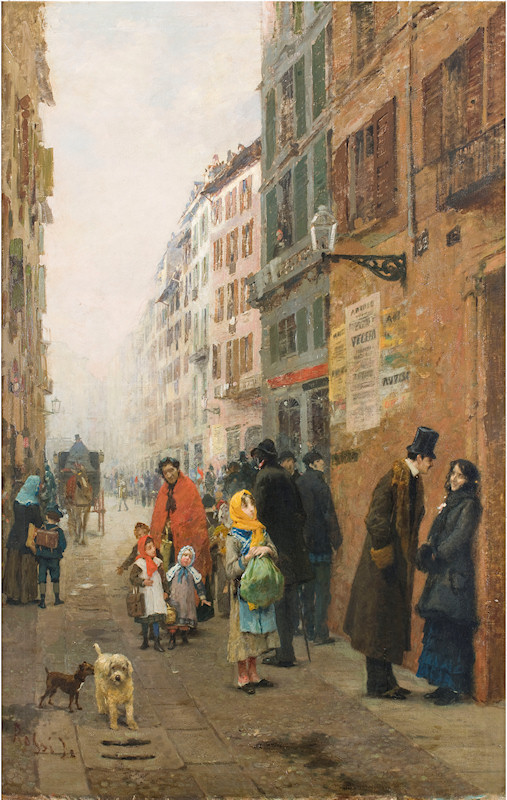
A Milanese street (ca. 1881)

Luigi Rossi (1853–1923) was a Swiss painter and illustrator.

== Biography ==
Luigi Rossi was born in Cassarate, Lugano. Having studied at the Brera Academy of Fine Arts under the guidance of Giuseppe Bertini, Rossi made his artistic debut in 1871, inaugurating a repertoire of genre scenes with a subtle vein of social criticism that was to be a distinctive feature of his work. His Swiss origin prevented him from receiving the prestigious Prince Umberto Prize, reserved for citizens of the Kingdom of Italy, in 1878.

Rossi's repertoire then broadened during the 1880s to include mountain landscapes painted en plein air, scenes of peasant life and portraits. The period from 1885 to 1888 was spent in Paris, where he also worked a great deal as an illustrator (for Alphonse Daudet and Pierre Loti in particular; see Madame Chrysanthème for details).

Having returned to Milan, he came into contact with the poet Gian Pietro Lucini, a meeting that marks a turning point also in his work as a painter. This led to some of his most celebrated canvases, which are still solidly realistic but informed by the new Symbolist approach.

A regular participant in the major Italian and international events with paintings and watercolours, Rossi held a solo show at the Galleria Pesaro, Milan, in 1921. He died in Biolda, Lugano. His death was commemorated with two posthumous shows, one at the Società per le Belle Arti ed Esposizione Permanente in Milan and the other at Villa Ciani, Lugano, in 1924.

== Other projects ==
Media related to Luigi Rossi at Wikimedia Commons
