= The Three from the Filling Station =

The Three from the Filling Station (German: Die Drei von der Tankstelle) may refer to:

- The Three from the Filling Station (1930 film), directed by Wilhelm Thiele and starring Lilian Harvey
- The Three from the Filling Station (1955 film), directed by Hans Wolff
- The Three from the Filling Station (play), a play based on the films

== See also ==
- Le chemin du paradis, the French language version of the 1930 film, also starring Harvey
