= My Brother Yves =

Novel by Pierre Loti

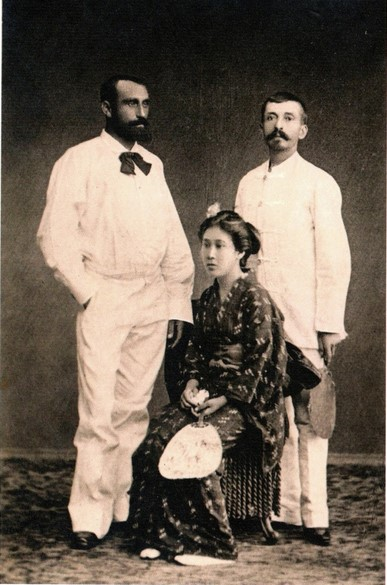
Pierre Loti (right) with "Chrysanthème" and Pierre le Cor in Japan, 1885.

My Brother Yves (French: Mon Frère Yves, 1883) is a semi-autobiographical novel by French author Pierre Loti. It describes the friendship between French naval officer Pierre Loti and a hard drinking Breton sailor Yves Kermadec during the 1870s and 80s. It was probably Loti's best-known book, and its descriptions of Breton seafaring life, on board ship and on shore, set the tone for his later acclaimed work An Iceland Fisherman (1886).

The fictional Yves was, in reality, Loti's friend, the Breton sailor Pierre le Cor, whom he had sailed with on a number of voyages. A functional illiterate, le Cor was, however, tall, fair and handsome; everything Loti wanted to be. Like Yves, le Cor was a heavy drinker, while Loti hardly drank at all. The two often spent time ashore either gambling, brawling, scheming childish pranks, or roaming the countryside of Brittany where le Cor introduced Loti to the lore of the Breton culture. In Brittany, Loti met le Cor's mother, and swore to watch over her son forever, although le Cor's hard drinking often tested the bonds of their friendship.

Although the novel has raised questions about whether Loti might have been describing a homosexual relationship, it is clear from the book that Yves (and, thus, Pierre le Cor) was first and foremost a companion and friend.

The relationship between Loti and Yves Kermadec also plays a role in Fleurs d'ennui (1882), and Madame Chrysanthème (1887).
