= Vedel =

Vedel is a surname. Notable people with the surname include:

- Anders Sørensen Vedel (1542–1616), priest and historian born in Vejle, Denmark
- Artemy Vedel (1767–1808), 18th century Ukrainian composer
- Dominique Honoré Antoine Vedel (1771–1848), French general
- Émile Vedel (1858–1937), French naval officer and writer
- Georges Vedel (1910–2002), French public law professor from Auch, France
- Kristian Solmer Vedel (1923–2003), Danish industrial designer and part of the Scandinavian Design movement
- Alexandre-Louis Poulet, called Vedel, French dramatist who served as director-manager of the Comédie-Française

== See also ==
- Vedel Islands, Antarctica
