= Piyer Loti Museum =

Museum in Istanbul, Turkey

Coordinates: 41°3′16″N 28°56′3″E

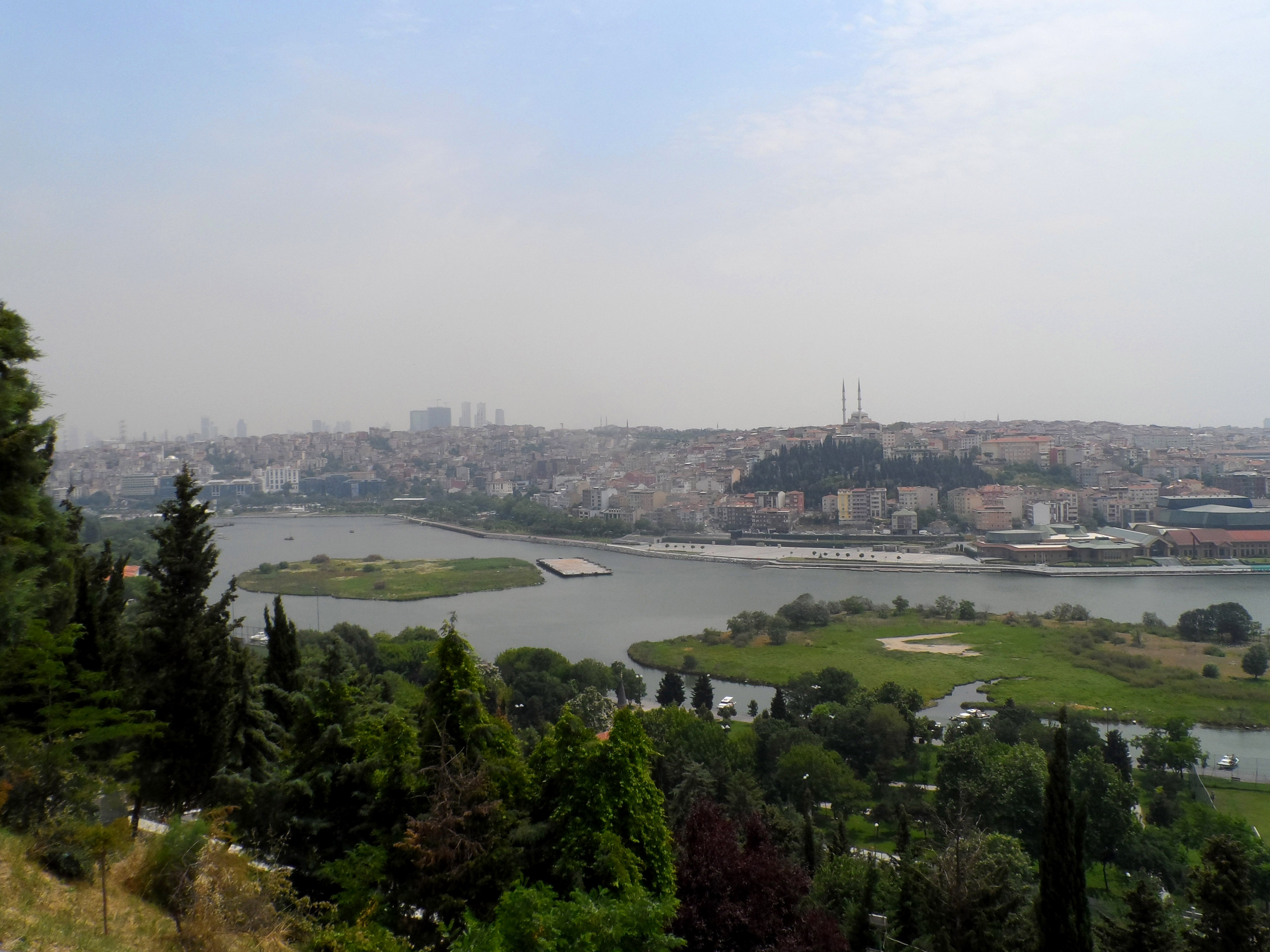
View of Golden Horn from Piyer Loti Hill, Istanbul

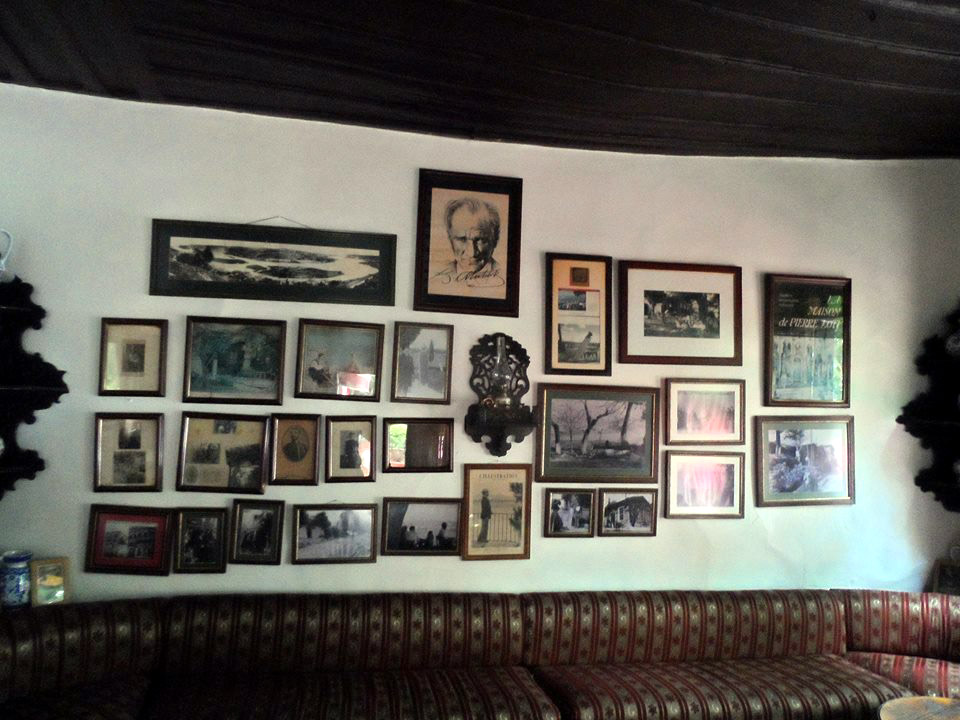
Interior of the museum

Piyer Loti Museum is a museum in Istanbul, Turkey. Piyer Loti refers to Pierre Loti (1850–1923), the French novelist who spent a part of his life in Istanbul.

== Location ==
The museum is located on a hill named after Pierre Loti, to the south of Haliç ("Golden Horn") in the secondary municipality of Eyüp in Istanbul. Its altitude is only about 70 metres (230 ft). Although not particularly high, it offers a splendid view of Golden Horn.

== History ==
During the Ottoman Empire age, the hill was a popular picnic area. According to the 17th century Turkish traveller Evliya Çelebi, the hill and the surrounding area was called İdris Köşkü Mesiresi ("The İdris Mansion resort). In the 19th century, there was a coffeehouse named Rabia Kadın Kahvesi. Pierre Loti who came to Istanbul in 1876 frequently visited the coffeehouse and completed his novel Aziyadé in the coffeehouse.

== The hill and the museum ==
The Rabia Kadın Coffehouse, now called Piyer Loti Coffeehouse survives. It is several hundred meters to Eyüp centrum. It is possible to drive or walk to the coffeehouse. Istanbul municipality has also established a lift service. There are small souvenir shops at the entrance of the coffeehouse. The free-of-charge museum has been established in a part of the coffeehouse. There are photographs, examples of Pierre Loti novels, a gramophone and a typewriter of Pierre Loti.
