= Madame Chrysanthème =

Madame Chrysanthème may refer to:

- Madame Chrysanthème (novel), 1887 story by Pierre Loti
- Madame Chrysanthème (opera), 1893 opera by André Messager, based on the novel
