= Fautaua Valley =

Valley in Tahiti, French Polynesia

Coordinates: 17.52°S 149.55°W

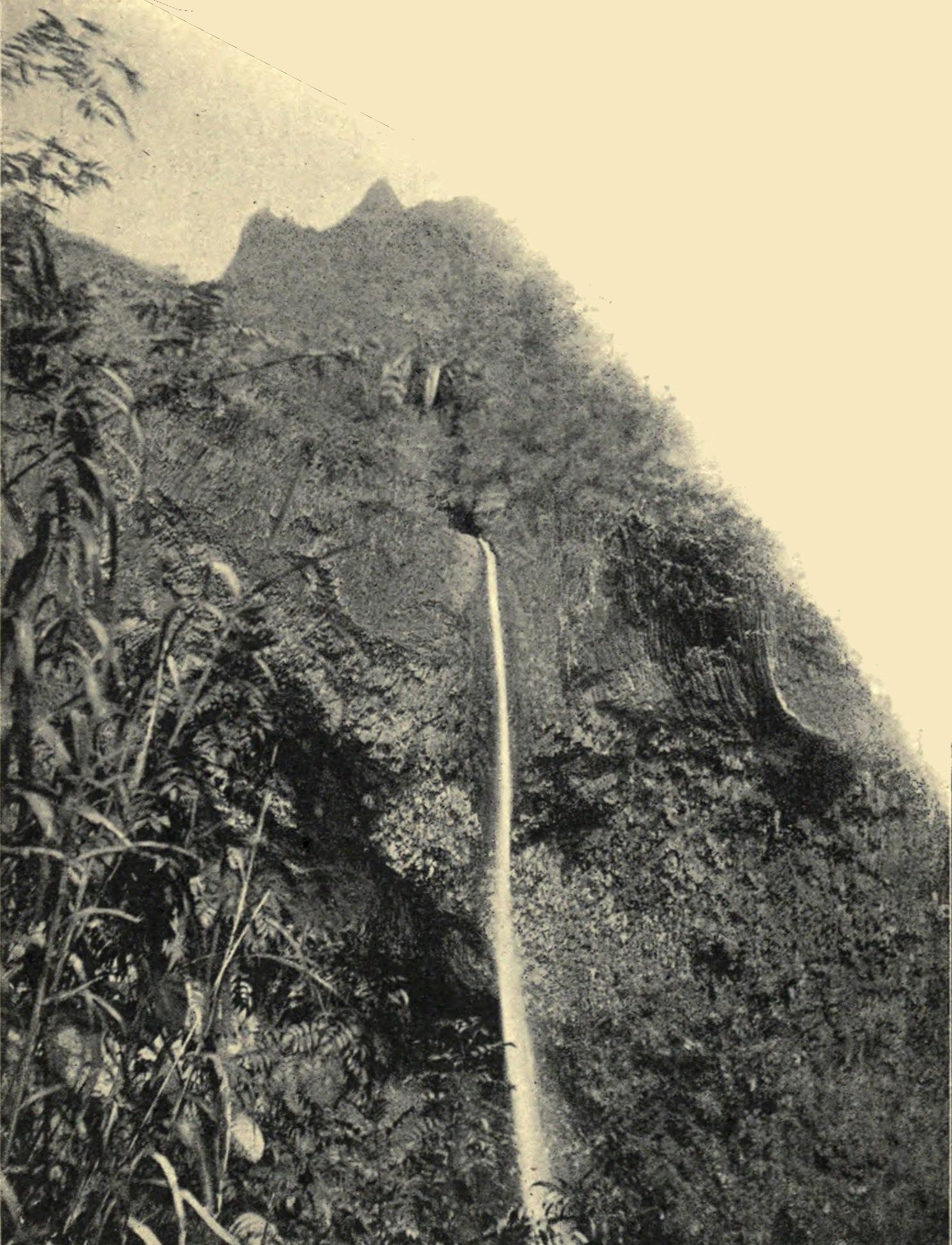
The Fautaua Waterfall

Fautaua Valley is a river valley on the island of Tahiti, in French Polynesia. It is located near the capital of Papeete. The Fautaua River flows through it, eventually cascading down the mountainside as the Fautaua Falls almost 300 metres (980 ft) into a shallow bathing pool called Loti Bain. The pool is named for the French writer Pierre Loti, who lived in the area for some time. It is the 28th-highest waterfall in the world. The falls are also known as Fachoda Falls, after Fort Fachoda, a ruined fort found at the top of the falls.

The falls are accessible for tourists and hikers, although the purchase of an access permit is required. The hike is estimated to take anywhere from 3–6 hours, depending on which route one takes.

Scientists have studied the flora and fauna of the Fautaua Valley. Examples of earwig species Hamaxas nigrorufus and Chelisoches morio were found in the valley in a survey in 1949. Examples of mosses from genus Fissidens such as F. clarkii, F. mangarevensis, and newly described species F. fautauae were located in the valley during surveys in 1960.

== See also ==
- List of waterfalls
