= Max de Vaucorbeil =

Belgian film director

- Born: 20 November 1901; Brussels, Belgium
- Died: 2 April 1982 (aged 80); Mougins, France
- Occupation: Director
- Years active: 1928-1957 (film)

Max de Vaucorbeil (20 November 1901–2 April 1982) was a Belgian film director. He earned a degree in political science and worked as a journalist prior to his career in film. His first work in the movies was as Léonce Perret's assistant director for the film La Danseuse Orchidée (1928) which was followed by his first work as director, The Road to Paradise (1930). He directed A Weak Woman (1933) which was based on the play Une faible femme by Jacques Deval, and The Marriage of Ramuntcho (1947) which was adapted from Pierre Loti's 1897 novel Ramuntcho. As an actor he had a role in Jean Dréville's film Le Grand Rendez-vous (1950). His final directing credit was as assistant director to Federico Fellini on the film I Vitelloni (1953). He died at the age of 80 in Mougins, France.

== Selected filmography ==
- The Road to Paradise (1930)
- Captain Craddock (1932, based on a novel by Friedrich Reck-Malleczewen)
- Princess, At Your Orders! (1931)
- A Weak Woman (1933)
- Mam'zelle Spahi (1934, based on a play by Étienne Arnaud and André Heuzé)
- Alexis, Gentleman Chauffeur (1938)
- Mademoiselle Béatrice (1943)
- The Marriage of Ramuntcho (1947)

== Bibliography ==
- Goble, Alan (1999). The Complete Index to Literary Sources in Film. Bowker-Saur. ISBN 9783110951943.
- Rège, Philippe (2010). "Vaucorbeil, Max de". Encyclopedia of French Film Directors. Vol. I. Scarecrow Press. ISBN 9780810869394.
