= Ramuntcho (Pierné) =

Written by Gabriel Pierné (1908)

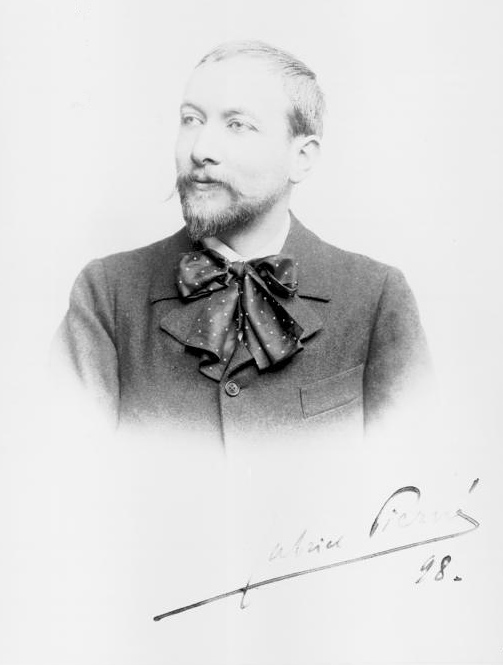
Gabriel Pierné in 1898

The incidental music for Ramuntcho was written by Gabriel Pierné in 1908 for a staged version of Pierre Loti's 1897 novel Ramuntcho, which was presented at the Théâtre de l'Odéon in Paris. In 1910, Pierné arranged the music into two orchestral suites.

== Structure of the music ==
Although the composition is melancholic, like Basque music in general, one of the main characters of these suites is the quintuple rhythm of the zortziko, which appears in the first half of the Overture and the latter part of the Rapsodie.

The structure of the suites is as follows:

=== Suite No. 1 ===
1. Ouverture
2. Le Jardin de Gracieuse
3. La chambre de Franchita
4. Fandango

=== Suite No. 2 ===
1. La Cidrerie
2. Le Couvent
3. Rapsodie Basque

== The production ==
The play takes place in the French Basque Country, and describes its scenery and its way of life. But above all it is about its young hero, Ramuntcho. The turning point in a not very eventful story comes when Ramuntcho, smuggler and pelota champion, returns to his village after three years of military service and finds that Gracieuse, whom he was expecting to marry in spite of her mother's opposition, has been coerced into entering a convent. And there, in spite of Ramuntcho's efforts, she stays. In the last scene, Gracieuse is challenged by her Mother Superior to make the choice between God and her lover, applying so much emotional pressure that the young nun drops dead under the stress of it.

Pierné's incidental music contributed significantly to the success of the production. It was greeted at the time as ‘full of the conflicting languor, passion and religious fervour of the Basque Country’, and supplied much of the local colour so lovingly described in the novel but difficult to represent on the stage.

The Overture to the play, which opens Suite No. 1, the first of two orchestral suites drawn from the Ramuntcho music in 1910, is a demonstration of how seriously and at the same time how entertainingly Pierné set about creating an authentically Basque backdrop. Rather than designing a unified symphonic construction, he put together a sequence of episodes each with a rhythmically distinctive zortzico in 5/8 time, its own Basque material.

The overture is followed by the serene, delicate and atmospheric Gracieuse’s Garden. It is set where Ramuntcho and the chaste Gracieuse had their secret meetings, is an idyllic inspiration featuring an expressive exchange between two flutes. On his return to the village from military service he finds her mother Franchita close to death – an event anticipated in Franchita’s Room, which is chilling in its minor harmonies on muted horns, dark in its bassoon and cello colours, desolate in a solo viola's musing on a Basque lament. Ramuntcho and Gracieuse also used to meet at village dances such as that represented here by a fandango with picturesque interventions from a pair of piccolos and a drum echoing the pipe-and-tabor bands of the region.

Suite No. 2 begins with the Cider House which reflects the conviviality of the place where Ramuntcho and his smuggler companions would plot their sorties into Spain and, no doubt, entertain themselves with folk tunes like the two introduced separately at first and combined in the closing bars. The Convent is a contrastingly ethereal piece reflecting in its scoring for muted strings the rarefied atmosphere of the nunnery and, with the entry of an ancient Basque canticle on woodwind, anticipating the death of Gracieuse. At the end of the second suite the Basque Rhapsody balances the “Overture on Basque Tunes” at the beginning of the first. But, while it too is constructed in episodes each with its own Basque tune, it conforms to her rhapsody type by beginning unhurriedly and gradually increasing in speed. The central highlight is another 5/8 zortzico, this one introduced by piccolo and oboe over an ostinato rhythm on a traditional Basque drum. The exhilarating ending is based on the unofficial Basque anthem Gernikako arbola.

== Recordings ==
The latest recording of these suites (2011) was by the BBC Philharmonic Orchestra led by Juanjo Mena, for Chandos Records. There is a 1929 recording of excerpts with Pierné himself conducting the Colonne Orchestra; it was reissued on CD in a compilation on Pierné's recordings by Malibran Records.
