= Gabriel Pierné =

French pianist and composer

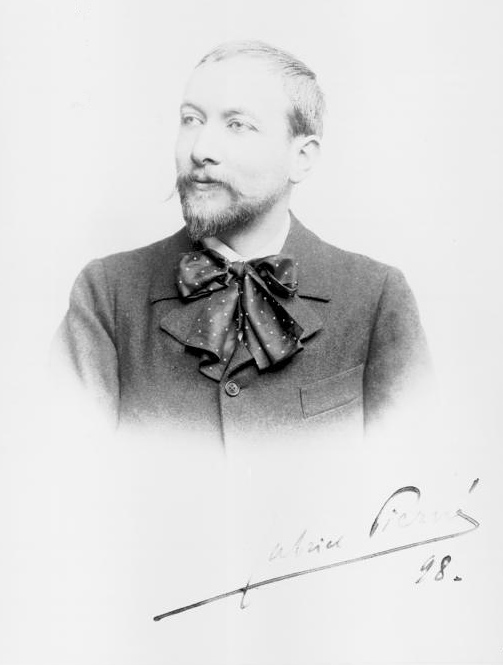
- Pierné in 1898.

Background information
- Born: Henri Constant Gabriel Pierné; 16 August 1863; Metz, France
- Died: 17 July 1937 (aged 73) Ploujean, Finistère, France
- Occupations: Composer, conductor, instrumentalist
- Instruments: Piano; organ
- Years active: 1882–1934

Henri Constant Gabriel Pierné (16 August 1863 – 17 July 1937) was a French composer, conductor, pianist and organist.

== Biography ==
Gabriel Pierné was born in Metz. His family moved to Paris, after Metz and part of Lorraine were annexed to Germany in 1871 following the Franco-Prussian War. He studied at the Paris Conservatoire, gaining first prizes for solfège, piano, organ, counterpoint and fugue. He won the French Prix de Rome in 1882, with his cantata Edith. His teachers included Antoine François Marmontel, Albert Lavignac, Émile Durand, César Franck (for the organ) and Jules Massenet (for composition).

He succeeded César Franck as organist at Sainte-Clotilde Basilica in Paris from 1890 to 1898. He himself was succeeded by another distinguished Franck pupil, Charles Tournemire. Associated for many years with Édouard Colonne's concert series, the Concerts Colonne, from 1903, Pierné became chief conductor of this series in 1910.

His most notable early performance was the world premiere of Igor Stravinsky's ballet The Firebird, at the Ballets Russes, Paris, on 25 June 1910. He remained in the post until 1933 (when Paul Paray took over his duties).

He made a few electrical recordings for Odeon Records, from 1928 to 1934, conducting the L'Orchestre Colonne, including a 1929 performance of his Ramuntcho and a 1931 performance of excerpts from his ballet Cydalise et le Chevre-pied.

He died in Ploujean, Finistère.

== Music ==
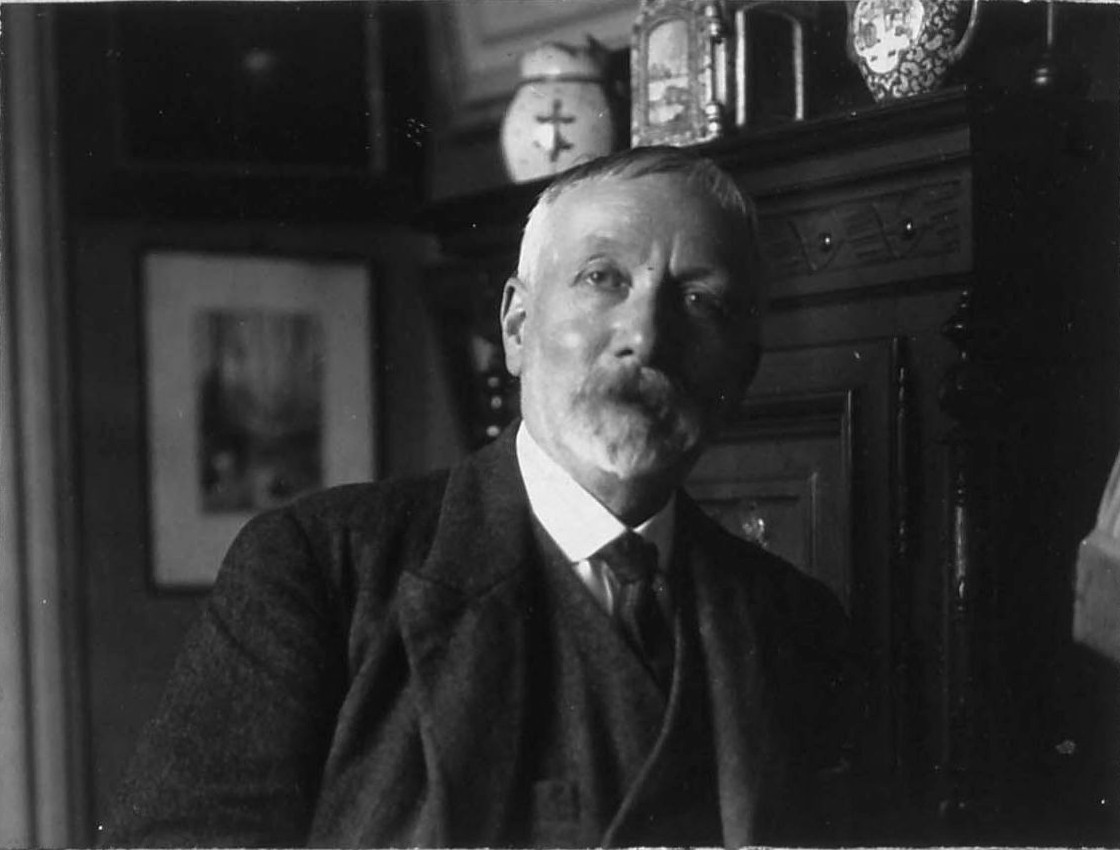
Gabriel Pierné (1925)

Pierné wrote several operas, choral and symphonic pieces as well as a good deal of chamber music. His most famous composition is probably the oratorio La Croisade des enfants based on the book by Marcel Schwob. Also notable are such shorter works as his March of the Little Lead Soldiers, which once enjoyed substantial popularity (not only in France) as an encore; the comparably popular Marche des petits faunes is from his ballet Cydalise et le Chèvre-pied. His chamber work Introduction et variations sur une ronde populaire for saxophone quartet is a standard in the saxophone quartet repertoire.

His discovery and promotion of the work of Ernest Fanelli in 1912 led to a controversy over the origins of impressionist music.

One critic described him as "the French Mahler, not stylistically perhaps, but in terms of his skill set. A superb conductor, he applied his podium experience to his compositions, writing immaculately finished, brilliantly scored pieces in a wide range of styles," while another described his work as "pleasant, wonderfully fluent but ultimately unremarkable examples of French late romanticism."

== Honours ==
Pierné became a member of the Academie des Beaux Arts in 1925. He was made a Commandeur de la Légion d'Honneur in 1935. His tomb at Père Lachaise Cemetery has a headstone designed by sculptor Henri Bouchard.

Square Gabriel Pierné in Paris is named after him.

== Selected compositions ==
=== Orchestral works ===
- Serenade for Strings
- Trois pièces formant suite de concert, 1883
- Suite No. 1, 1883
- Envois de Rome (Suite – Ouverture – Les Elfes), c. 1885
- Ballet de cour, 1901
- Two suites from the incidental music for Ramuntcho, 1910
- Paysages franciscains, Op. 43, 1920
- Divertissement sur un thème pastoral, Op. 49, 1932
- Gulliver au pays de Lilliput, 1935
- Viennoise, suite, Op. 49bis, 1935

=== Concertante works ===
- Fantaisie-ballet, for piano and orchestra, 1885
- Piano concerto, Op. 12, 1886
- Scherzo-caprice, for piano and orchestra, 1890
- Concertstück, for harp and orchestra, 1901
- Poème symphonique, for piano and orchestra, 1903
- Fantaisie basque, for violin and orchestra, 1927

=== Works for band ===
- Marche des petits soldats de plomb (March of the Little Lead Soldiers), 1887
- Marche solennelle, 1899 (dedicated to Gustave Wettge)
- Petit Gavotte et Farandole
- Ramuntcho (also arranged for orchestra), (published 1908)

=== Operas ===
- La Coupe enchantée, 1895
- Vendée (Drame lyrique), 1897
- La Fille de Tabarin (opéra comique), 1901
- On ne badine pas avec l'amour (opéra comique), 1910
- Sophie Arnould (opéra comique), 1927
- Fragonard, 1934

=== Ballets ===
- Le Collier de Saphir, 1891
- Les Joyeuses commères de Paris, 1892
- Izéÿl, 1894
- Bouton-d'or, 1895
- Salome, 1895 (premiere starring Loie Fuller at the Comedie-Parisienne, Paris) March 4, 1895 closed 27 April.
- Cydalise et le Chèvre-pied, 1923
- Impressions de music-hall, 1927
- Giration, 1934
- Images, 1935

=== Music for theatre ===
- Yanthis, 1894
- La Princesse Lointaine, 1895
- La Samaritaine, 1897
- Francesca da Rimini, 1902
- Ramuntcho, 1908
- Les Cathédrales, 1915

=== Chamber works ===
- Sonata in D minor, Op. 36 (violin or flute and piano), 1900.
- Piano Quintet, Op. 41 (2 violins, viola, cello and piano), 1917
- Trio in C minor, Op. 45 (violin, cello and piano), 1920–21
- Sonata in F sharp minor, Op 46 (Sonate en une partie) (cello and piano), 1922
- Sonata da camera, Op.48 (flute, cello and piano), 1926

=== Piano works ===
- Étude de concert in C minor, Op. 13, 1887
- Album pour mes petits amis, Op. 14, (published 1887)

=== Solo works ===
- Serenade, Op. 7 (violin and piano), 1881
- Impromptu-Caprice, Op. 9 (harp), (published circa 1901)
- Piece in G minor (oboe), 1883
- Solo de concert (bassoon and piano), 1898
- Canzonetta, Op. 19 (clarinet and piano), 1888
- Trois pièces Op. 29 (organ), (published circa 1892)

Toccata in D minor for Organ

=== Choral works ===
- L'An Mil, (published 1898)
  - no. 1. Miserere Mei
  - no. 2. Fete Des Fous Et de L'ane
  - no. 3. Te Deum
- Les Cathédrales, 1915
  - no. 1. Prélude des cathédrales
  - no. 3. Chanson Picarde
  - no. 7. Épisode des églises
  - no. 8. Épisode des Flandres

=== Songs ===
- 6 Ballades françaises de Paul Fort, (circa 1920)
  - No. 1, La Vie
  - No. 2, La Baleines
  - No. 3, Complainte des Arches de Noé
  - No. 4, Le petit rentier
  - No. 5, Les dernières pensées
  - No. 6, La Ronde autour du monde
- Deux mélodies
  - Découragement
  - À Saint Blaise
- Poèmes de Jean Lorrain
  - no. 1. Le Beau Pirate
  - no. 2. Les Petites Ophélies
  - no. 3. Les Petits Elfes
  - no. 4. Une belle est dans la forêt
  - no. 5. Ils étaient trois petits chats blancs
- Soirs de Jadis
  - no. 1. La princesse au bord du ruisseau
  - no. 2. Ils s'aimaient
  - no. 3. Ce qui frappa ses yeux d'abord
  - no. 4. Le soir tombe sur la rivière
- Trois adaptations musicales sur des vers
  - no. 1. La marjolaine
  - no. 2. Nuit divine
  - no. 3. Noël

== Bibliography ==
- Henri Busser: Notice sur la vie et des oeuvres de M. Gabriel Pierné (Paris: Académie des Beaux Arts, 1938).
- Georges Masson: Gabriel Pierné, musicien lorrain (Nancy: Presses Universitaires de Nancy, 1987).
