= Ernest Fanelli =

French composer (1860–1917)

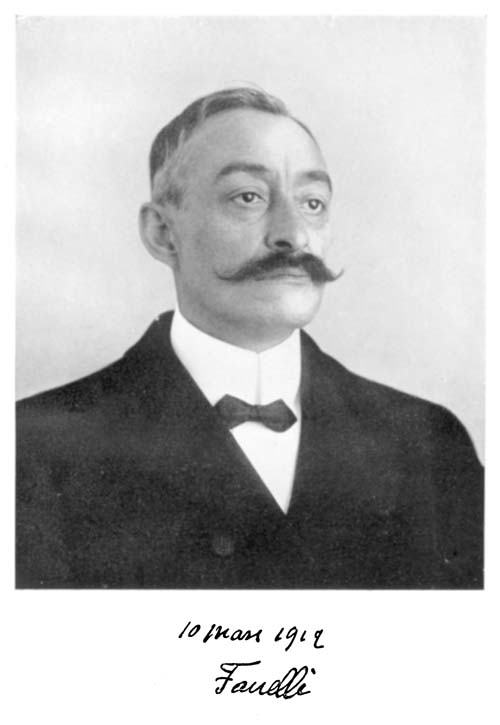
Fanelli in 1912

Ernest Fanelli (29 June 1860 – 24 November 1917) was a French composer who is known for his works which have been considered as precursing Impressionism. He gained renown when his symphonic poem Thèbes premiered in Paris; this was a work incorporating elements associated with music ahead of its time, such as unique harmonies, extended chords, and polytonality.

Fanelli was born in Paris to Italian parents and started studying music at the age of 10. He earned a living playing timpani and piano, eventually composing seriously when he was 22, although he abandoned the activity in 1894. Upon applying to work as a copyist for Gabriel Pierné in 1912, his music—a manuscript of Thèbes, composed in 1883—astonished the latter, and a performance led to wide publicity and critical assessment of Fanelli's music and of the roots of the Impressionist style, especially that of Claude Debussy. Fanelli lived in poverty and struggled to support his family. He died in 1917 in Paris.

His oeuvre includes orchestral works, 32 orchestrally-accompanied songs, a few chamber works and a three-act opera buffa. Most of his works are of long duration, which may have discouraged their performance, as may their modernism. Dark humor is a common theme in some compositions, and he often used full orchestras with a large brass section. George Antheil asserted that Fanelli was "one of the greatest inventors and musical iconclasts of all time" but bemoaned that he "discovered the nuclei of a new movement, but he failed to discover that movement itself".

== Life ==
Ernest Fanelli was born on 29 June 1860 in Paris to a family which emigrated from Bologna, Italy; his father was a bank clerk. He began studying music aged 10, eventually enrolling at the Paris Conservatoire. After refusing to attend the classes of a teacher he disliked, Fanelli was expelled from the conservatoire, following which he earned his income by playing timpani for small orchestras. In 1876, he was re-admitted to the conservatoire and studied composition with the French composer Léo Delibes. (Note: Some sources claim that Ernest Fanelli was a pupil of Charles-Valentin Alkan at the Paris Conservatoire. However, Fanelli studied at the Conservatoire in 1876, long after Alkan had left it back in 1848.) A balance between working and studying proved arduous, and Fanelli progressed slowly; he later quit due to financial issues. From then on, he made a living playing percussion and piano and studied musical scores to improve his technical proficiency. At the age of 22, Fanelli started composing seriously, producing various orchestral and chamber pieces. Unsuccessful in securing their performance, he worked as a copyist and music engraver and resigned from composition in 1894.

In 1912, Fanelli applied to work as a copyist for the composer and conductor Gabriel Pierné. The latter received a neatly written manuscript by Fanelli, of which the musical content greatly impressed him. It was the manuscript of Fanelli's symphonic poem Thèbes, the first part of Tableaux Symphoniques, which he said was composed 29 years prior. A stunned Pierné remarked that the piece is "astonishingly modern considering the time when he began to write". He quickly arranged a performance of Thèbes with the Colonne Orchestra, which he conducted on 17 March 1912. It was a triumphant success, although it didn't convince Fanelli to return to composition. There were performances of Impressions pastorales on 23 February 1913 and Fête dans le palais du Pharaon (the second set of Tableaux Symphoniques) on 30 May, conducted by Pierné respectively. After this, Fanelli fell into obscurity and was struggling to support his family. Judith Gautier and her father Théophile had supported him financially, convinced that he would be considered one of the great composers. He died in Paris on 24 November 1917.

== Works ==
List of compositions by Ernest Fanelli (Note: Information is from Rosar 2001 unless otherwise noted.)
| Title | Year | Genre |
|---|---|---|
| Souvenirs poétiques | 1872–8 | ? |
| Souvenirs de jeunesse | 1872–8 | Solo piano |
| Les deux tonneaux Opera buffa in 3 acts, after Voltaire | c. 1879 | Opera |
| 32 songs | 1880–92 | Vocal orchestral accompaniment |
| St Preux à Clarens | 1881 | Orchestral |
| Tableaux Symphoniques | 1882–6 | Orchestral |
| Thèbes act 1 of Tableaux Symphoniques | 1883 | Orchestral |
| Mascarade | 1889 | Orchestral |
| Suite Rabelaisienne | 1889 | Orchestral |
| Au palais de l'escorial | 1890 | Orchestral |
| Carnaval | 1890 | Orchestral |
| Impressions pastorales | 1890 | Orchestral |
| Marche héroique | 1891 | Orchestral |
| Une nuit chez Sophor | 1891 | Chamber flute, clarinet, strings, (Note: Ezra Pound mentions two violins, a cello, and a double bass.) piano |
| Humoresques (Note: Adriano and Calvocoressi both explicitly mention that there are four Humoresques.) | 1892–4 | Chamber clarinet, piano |
| L'Aneu (Note: Spelled "L'Ane" by Adriano and Pound.) | 1894 | Chamber string quintet |
| L'Effroi du soleil | ? | Orchestral |

Fanelli stopped composing in 1894, and in the period between that and meeting Pierné in 1912, he was void of any musical ideas, presumably owing to his financial situation. Most of Fanelli's compositions are long in duration—the Impressions pastorales, for example, requires 3 hours, and the orchestrally-accompanied songs being described as unusually long. The music critic Michel-Dimitri Calvocoressi argues that this discouraged performances of his works, but that it highlights Fanelli's capability of "abundant invention" without redundancy. Judith Gautier believed that this was due to the modernism in Fanelli's works. He often displayed dark humor in his compositions. For instance, in the lyric work L'Effroi du soleil ("Fear of the sun"), the executioner runs after a severed head that bounced from the scaffold, only to confuse it with the setting sun.

=== Orchestral ===
The musicologist William Rosar notes that wind band timbres appealed to Fanelli, who in some orchestral compositions used sarrusophones and saxhorns. He also often used full orchestras with a large brass section. In an article about Fanelli works, Ezra Pound wrote that the modernism in Fanelli's orchestral compositions such as L'Effroi du Soleil and Suite rabelaisienne would have "made Berlioz turn pale". Suite rabelaisienne is based on three chapters from François Rabelais's Gargantua and Pantagruel.

Impressions pastorales is a symphonic suite of 22 short movements, written in 1890, which premiered on 30 May 1913 with Pierné as conductor. Calvocoressi characterized the work's content as being in "flagrant contradiction" to Impressionism but that it "reveals in M. Fanelli a touch of romantic spirit". He further commented that Fanelli wanted publicity through a later, more modern work and not Thèbes, surmising that Impressions pastorales was a possible candidate.

==== Tableaux Symphoniques ====
One of Fanelli's earliest works is also his only published work, Thèbes (1883), from the first set of Tableaux Symphoniques ("Symphonic pictures"). (Note: Apart from a piano reduction of Thèbes, Pound claims that one of his songs (La Vierge de Prompt Secours) and the first of his four Humoresques were also published.) Tableaux Symphoniques (1882–1886 (Note: This is according to Rosar; however, Adriano and Pound write that it was composed 1882–1883 and later in 1886. Calvocoressi gives the years 1883–1887.)) contains two sets of symphonic poems—Thèbes and Fête dans le palais du Pharaon—based on Théophile Gautier's 1858 novel Le Roman de La Momie (Romance of the Mummy), a story set in ancient Egypt. Fanelli quotes the novel in his manuscript and dedicated the work to Gautier's daughter Judith. Calvocoressi compares the oriental style of Thèbes to that of Alexander Borodin.

Thèbes is the piece that raised interest in the composer in the Parisian press following its 1912 performance. It utilizes harmonic and technical features which are characteristic of Impressionist music, including unique harmonies and extended chords, polytonality, complex time signatures, and whole-tone scales; Adriano acclaimed "perhaps the first example in French music history in which sound and instrumental colour become principal means of musical expression", adding that Fanelli departed from absolute music and "tone-painting" characteristic of Romantic music. In a review of the 1912 performance, Maurice Ravel criticized Thèbes, perceiving it as having overloaded textures and effects that lasted too long. He remained unimpressed by Fanelli's novelties which some saw as a precursor to Claude Debussy's Impressionism, (Note: Ravel commented against some critics who tried to diminish Debussy's achievements, and with irony wrote: "M. Debussy is customarily subjected to an attack of this kind every year. We already knew that the discovery of his harmonic system was due entirely to Erik Satie, that of his drama to Mussorgsky, and that of his orchestration to Rimsky-Korsakov. Now we know whence comes his Impressionism.") maintaining that these novelties were already utilized by past composers, including Franz Liszt, Alexander Dargomyzhsky, and Félicien David. Ravel was impressed with "the most picturesque orchestration" that Fanelli created but decried the Colonne Orchestra's performance, feeling that they did not do it justice. Ravel opined that Fanelli's Impressionism differed from newer composers, stating that it stemmed from Berlioz rather than Liszt or Russian composers. The musicologist Jean d'Udine did not consider Tableaux Symphoniques a masterwork, but praised it as being highly modern, harmonically and formally, emphasizing Fanelli's genius with regards to him composing the piece at such a young age. Calvocoressi lauded Fanelli's ingenuity, but had reservations about how innovative Thèbes truly was, writing "In this respect M. Fanelli has shown himself a real precursor, even if his music does not resemble actual Impressionism any more than it resembles the French music of the early 'eighties".

=== Chamber ===
L'ane (Note: Spelled "L'Aneu" by Rosar.) ("The donkey") is a string quintet composed in 1894 and is Fanelli's last work. Its sorrow reflects his hardships. According to Calvocoressi, he also composed a piano quintet which was privately performed in 1892.

== Reputation ==
The American composer George Antheil asserted that Fanelli was "one of the greatest inventors and musical iconclasts of all time" but bemoaned that he "discovered the nuclei of a new movement, but he failed to discover that movement itself". He had visited Fanelli's widowed wife and tricked her into believing that he was a music critic willing to write about her deceased husband. Antheil gained permission to analyze his scores and wrote:

I soon discovered that Constantine von Sternberg had been right, (Note: Constantine von Sternberg, Antheil's teacher, had asserted that Debussy, Ravel and Satie had stolen their Impressionism from Fanelli.) at least in one regard: the works of Fanelli were pure "Afternoon of a faun" or "Daphnis and Chloë," at least in technique, and they predated the Debussy-Ravel-Satie works by many years. But, as I also soon discovered, they were not as talented as the works of the two slightly younger men, although they had had the advantage of being "firsts."

A 1918 issue of The Monthly Musical Record contained an obituary of Fanelli, writing that "exaggerated reports were circulated about a neglected genius, etc., but the music was simply sincere and expressive, and was soon forgotten". Debussy called him "a composer with an acute sense of musical ornamentation, dragged towards such an extreme need of minute description, making him lose his sense of direction". The musicologists Jacques-Gabriel Prod'homme and Marguerite Barton compare the distance between Fanelli's influence on French music and Debussy's as the distance between Heinrich Marschner's influence on opera and Richard Wagner's.
