= The Marriage of Ramuntcho =

1946 film by Max de Vaucorbeil

- Directed by: Max de Vaucorbeil
- Written by: Pierre Apestéguy; Ernst Neubach
- Based on: Ramuntcho by Pierre Loti
- Produced by: Paul Dutournier
- Starring: Gaby Sylvia; André Dassary; Frank Villard
- Cinematography: Raymond Clunie
- Edited by: Henri Taverna
- Music by: Marc Lanjean
- Production company: Films de France
- Distributed by: Distribution Parisienne de Films (Paris); Various (provinces)
- Release date: 9 April 1946; (Biarritz)
- Running time: 83 minutes
- Country: France
- Language: French

The Marriage of Ramuntcho (French: Le mariage de Ramuntcho) is a 1947 French comedy film directed by Max de Vaucorbeil and starring Gaby Sylvia, André Dassary and Frank Villard. It is often considered to be the first French feature using modern color photography. It is based on Pierre Loti's 1897 novel Ramuntcho.

== Cast ==
- Gaby Sylvia as Maritchu
- André Dassary as Ramuntcho
- Frank Villard as Georges Baermann
- Jean Hébey as L'hôtelier
- Marcel Maupi as L'oncle
- Anne-Marie Bruslay as Barbara
- Jean-Jacques Rouff as Puntamento
- Monique Delavaud as Katialine
- Arsenio Freignac as Carlo
- Mona Dol as Louise

== Precursors ==
Attempts at natural color filmmaking were few and far between in France before the 1950s. The seldom used Keller-Dorian system employed a proprietary additive film stock so complex that making copies of it was impossible. Francita Color, another additive process, was more practical but low fidelity. During German occupation, a few animated shorts made with imported Agfacolor stock pioneered subtractive color in the country, but no feature or live action film had yet been shot using this technology.

== Production ==
=== Development ===
In early 1946, Alice Charles, manager of Films de France, a documentary and news specialist, announced that she was moving her offices to the headquarters of distributor Distribution Parisienne de Film (D.P.F.), as her company was looking to branch out into features with the support of new D.P.F. boss Henry de Saint-Girons. The Marriage of Ramuntcho was the first of a two-picture slate announced in mid-April 1946 by Films de France. The second was a biopic of Count Cagliostro to be directed by Robert Péguy.

Both movies were hurried into production to capitalize on the discovery of unused Agfacolor reels left by the Germans at Éclair following their defeat. Producer Paul Dutournier chose to film Pierre Loti's novel Ramuntcho, largely from practical reasons: the story was set in his home region of the Basque Country, and he had already participated in another adaptation of the same novel before the war. He entrusted the film's story treatment to his friend, Basque novelist Pierre Aspétéguy.

=== Pre-production ===
A color photography specialist named Hongrand was brought in from Belgium to assist the French crew, which had no experience with the medium, and a test session was organized between late April and early May in Sare, a location of the previous Ramuntcho adaptation. Films de France was also out of its depth on the administrative side. The project's provisional budget was not balanced, which caused it to be turned down for public subsidies, before an appeal brought belated relief as the shoot was already underway.

=== Filming ===
Principal photography started in mid-July 1946. Various Basque performance groups, such as a dance troupe from Bidarray, were featured in the film. Supposedly, Dutournier enlisted the assistance of real smugglers working the Franco-Spanish border. Exterior filming in the Basque Country was marred by bad weather. Moreover, a significant part of the available stock had degraded significantly, barely leaving enough to complete the feature. The worse reels were reserved for night scenes in an effort to mitigate the problem.

Much of the film, however, was shot at the Victorine Studios in Nice, where the expensive recreation of a Basque public square pushed it further into the red. On August 1, Alice Charles and Henry de Saint-Girons jointly resigned from their respective positions at the head of Films de France and D.P.F. As it was now viewed as a showpiece for the French film industry, the venture was bailed out by additional government credits and advances on receipts from distributors. Production documents suggest that filming did not wrap up until October.

=== Post-production ===
Post-production was further hampered by the scarcity of Agfacolor material. Films de France, now steered by Gaby Silvia's businessman husband fr:Paul Annet Badel, had to resort to unusual means to obtain more, such as exchanging it against other stock with the Soviet armed forces, and buying trims sold on the side by G.I.s stationed in the country.

== Release ==
Billed as "The first French color film", The Marriage of Ramuntcho held its premiere gala at the Biarritz Casino on 9 April 1946, and a train car's worth of Parisian critics was convoyed to the Southern city for the occasion. The German Agfacolor process was rebranded as "Franco-Agfacolor" in promotional material. Thanks to its novelty, the picture was rather successful in Paris, where its original three-week engagement at the Gaumont-Palace and the Grand Rex was extended by an additional week. However, Films de France could not satisfy the demand for more copies due to the scarcity of color film stock, bringing the picture's box office tally to a screeching halt.

Those technical limitations also hindered international distribution. Five Ocean Film Company, an English sales outfit, commissioned a dubbed version called The Singing Smuggler from Rayant Pictures of Wembley, but faced difficulties selling it due to the poor print they had been provided. The movie was nonetheless purchased for the U.S. by Globe Film Distribution, a recently formed company from the owners of the Irving Place and City Theatres.

== Reception ==
=== Mainstream press ===
A critic for Parisian cultural weekly Gavroche delivered an encouraging review, conceding that The Marriage of Ramuntcho "should be judged less like a movie and more like an outstanding achievement" as "[c]ompared to America, England, Russia, we only had the good will of a few men" to pioneer color filmmaking. Yet she credited "a beautiful love story" and insisted that the film's colors were less garish that those displayed by Technicolor. Patriotism was not enough to ingratiate the film with other critics, however. Les Lettres françaises derided the "cruel technical inexperience" of the cinematographer and editor, as well as "the story's inanity" and "subpar actors". La Défense complained that "whether in color or in black and white, there is a silliness threshold that should not be crossed" and added that the director "did not make the film for the sake of colors but the sake of being first". Combat joked that "André Hugon's The Three Masks was the first French spoken film. There is still hope, then, for the future of color films after seeing The Marriage of Ramuntcho".

=== Trade press ===
In a capsule review directed at industry professionals, American trade magazine Variety called the film "sure box office for all Latin countries". British counterpart Kinetograph Weekly praised the film's "pictorial values" but deemed that it was "handicapped by [its] frivolous subject".

=== Audience ===
In a consumer study conducted by Gaumont at their Gaumont-Palace location in Paris, patrons named The Marriage of Ramuntcho as their favorite French film of the year, although it lagged behind four American imports.

== Legacy ==
While a second color feature titled Cagliostro was meant to be shot soon after Ramuntcho, all the available reels were used on the former, and the latter was quickly downgraded to a standard black and white production. However, the embattled Films de France never actually made it or any other full-length fiction work. France's next color feature, 1948's The Pretty Miller Girl, actually reverted to an additive method, the short-lived Rouxcolor. Modern, subtractive color films became commonplace in the country around 1950, through the use of the Belgian Gevacolor system.

== Bibliography ==
- Crisp, C.G. The Classic French Cinema, 1930–1960. Indiana University Press, 1993.
