= Alexis, Gentleman Chauffeur =

1938 film

- Directed by: Max de Vaucorbeil; René Guissart
- Written by: André Luguet; André Legrand
- Produced by: Gilbert Renault-Decker; Jean Rossi
- Starring: Suzy Prim; André Luguet; Raymond Cordy
- Cinematography: Enzo Riccioni
- Music by: Armand Bernard
- Production company: Films Renault-Decker
- Distributed by: DisCina
- Release date: 22 July 1938
- Running time: 91 minutes
- Country: France
- Language: French

Alexis, Gentleman Chauffeur (French: Alexis gentleman chauffeur) is a 1938 French comedy film directed by Max de Vaucorbeil and René Guissart and starring Suzy Prim, André Luguet and Raymond Cordy. The film's sets were designed by the art director Émile Duquesne.

== Synopsis ==
Film star Margot Fontane leaves her handbag in the taxi of Alexis de Saint-Grisols, a former First World War pilot of distinction now working as a taxi driver to make ends meet. She arranges for him to play the role of a driver in her latest film.

== Cast ==
- Suzy Prim as Madame Tabasco aka alias Margot Fontane
- André Luguet as Alexis de Saint-Grisols
- Raymond Cordy as Émile¨Panard
- Marcel Simon as Tabasco
- Michel Duran as Dornach
- Jean Marconi as Silvio
- Aimé Simon-Girard as Henri IV
- Doumel as Napoléon I
- Anthony Gildès as Le général
- Charles Lemontier as L'assistant
- Robert Ozanne as Un mécano
- Georges Lannes as Justin
- René Bergeron as Le chauffeur
- Dalcy as Alfred
- Pierre Labry as Un acteur
- Hélène Ray as La femme de chambre
- Annie Rozanne as Mlle Rose
- Jean Gobet as Le maquilleur
- Léonce Corne as L'opérateur
- Eddy Debray as Un mécano
- Pierre Juvenet as L'ambassadeur
- Marthe Sarbel as La sociétaire

== Bibliography ==
- Bessy, Maurice & Chirat, Raymond. Histoire du cinéma français: encyclopédie des films, Volume 2. Pygmalion, 1986.
- Crisp, Colin. Genre, Myth and Convention in the French Cinema, 1929-1939. Indiana University Press, 2002.
- Rège, Philippe. Encyclopedia of French Film Directors, Volume 1. Scarecrow Press, 2009.
