= Piano Concerto (Pierné) =

Three-movement composition by Gabriel Pierné

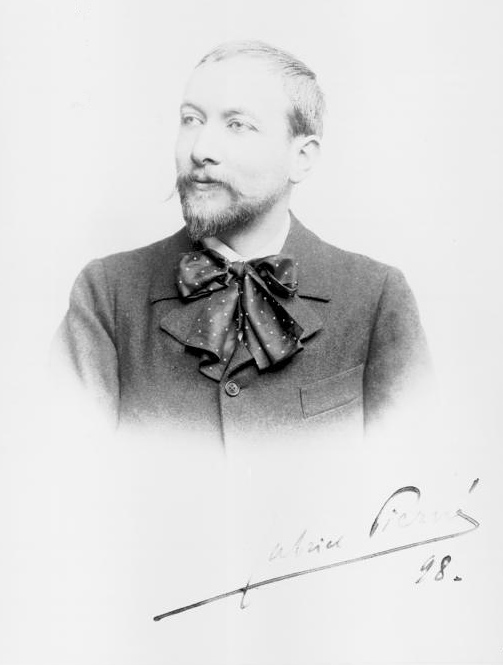
Gabriel Pierné in 1898

The Piano Concerto in C minor, Op. 12, is a three-movement composition for piano and orchestra by French composer Gabriel Pierné. The piece was completed in early 1887, shortly after Pierné returned to Paris from a three-year stay in Rome.

== Composition ==
Lasting roughly twenty minutes in performance, the concerto is composed in three movements:

1. Allegro
2. Scherzando
3. Final

=== Style and influences ===
The concerto has been compared to the music of fellow French composer Camille Saint-Saëns, specifically his Piano Concerto No. 2 in G minor. In the CD liner notes to conductor Juanjo Mena's recording of the Piano Concerto with the BBC Philharmonic, music critic Gerald Larner expanded on the Saint-Saëns comparison, saying:

Dedicated to Marie-Aimée Roger-Miclos, well known as an interpreter of the music of Saint-Saëns, it was modelled on that composer's already popular Piano Concerto No. 2 in G minor, Op. 22. The most obvious similarity between the two works is in the overall design with a scherzo in the central position place usually occupied by a slow movement. The first movement, however, is entirely Pierné's own, even if the imposing 'Maestoso' introduction does owe something to Saint Saëns. [...] The 'Allegro scherzando,' on the other hand, clearly derives from the Saint-Saëns model, which has the same tempo heading, is in the same key of E flat major and in the same 6/8 metre. There are melodic similarities too. It is no less engaging for that in its elfin rhythms, its brilliant piano writing and its deft scoring for orchestra, not least horn and trumpet.

However, the work has also been suggested by Larner and BBC Music Magazine critic Christopher Dingle as inspiration for the works of Sergei Rachmaninoff. Larner commented, "It is remarkable more for its anticipation of Rachmaninoff, who comes to mind again in the main 'Allegro deciso,' not in the first theme but when the piano introduces the splendid E-flat-major melody which is to dominate the middle section of the movement and inspire its broad central climax."

=== Instrumentation ===
The work is scored for solo piano and an orchestra consisting of two flutes, two oboes, two clarinets, two bassoons, four French horns, two trumpets, three trombones, timpani, tambour, and strings (violins I & II, violas, violoncellos, and double basses).

== Reception ==
Despite noting comparisons to Saint-Saëns, Bryce Morrison of Gramophone said the piece had "a scintillating character of its own" and specifically praised the second movement, saying, "Only a puritan could resist the second-movement 'Scherzando,' where a jaunty theme is sent spinning through a maze of sparkling Christmas-tree elaboration." In the All Music Guide to Classical Music, Adrian Corleonis likened the work to Pierné's own Fantaisie-ballet for Piano and Orchestra (1885), commenting, "If not great music, it is well made, often spurred by robust gaiety, and of engaging freshness." Corleonis added, "...[they] are imposing examples, their mock seriousness yielding to caressing lyricism."

Conversely, Andrew Clements of The Guardian called the work "a curiously bombastic mix of Saint-Saëns and Tchaikovsky" and added "I find its winsomeness hard to take, though others might be more tolerant."

== Bibliography ==
- Corleonis, Adrian (2005). Woodstra, Chris; Brennan, Gerald; Schrott, Allen (eds.). All Music Guide to Classical Music: The Definitive Guide to Classical Music. Backbeat Books. ISBN 0879308656.
