= Émile Pouvillon =

French novelist

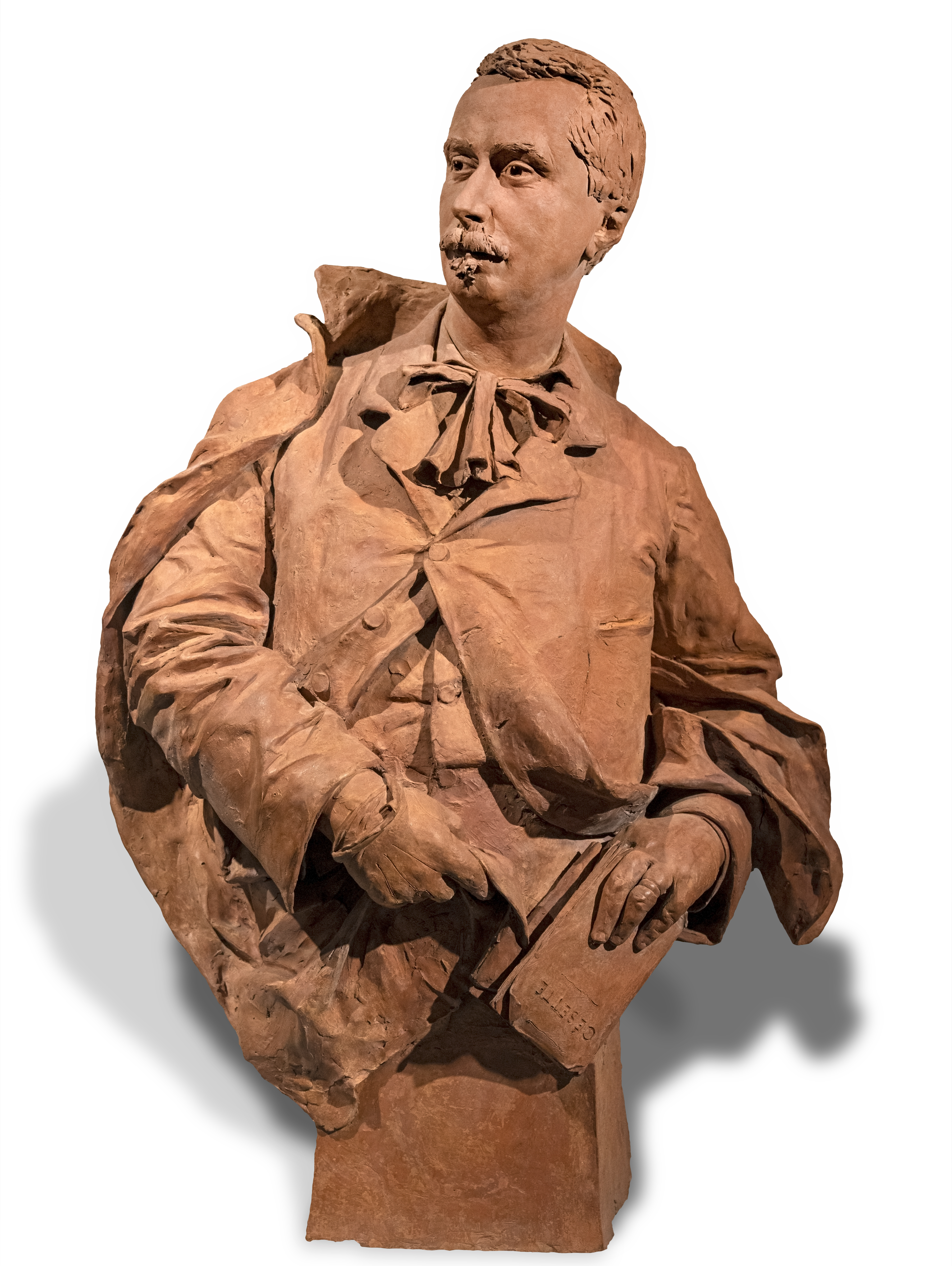
Bust by Antoine Bourdelle in Montauban

Émile Pouvillon (1840 in Montauban – 1906 in Chambéry) was a French novelist.

He published a collection of stories entitled Nouvelles réalistes in 1878. Making himself the chronicler of his native province of Quercy in southwestern France, he described its scenery and its life. His rustic novels were in the same vein as those of Jean de Noarrieu and André Theuriet. His L'Innocent (1884) was dedicated to his friend Pierre Loti (the pseudonym of the French naval lieutenant Julien Viaud), later author of Madame Chrysanthème (1887).

== Works ==
His books include:

- Césette (1881), the story of a peasant girl
- L'Innocent (1884)
- Jean-de-Jeanne (1886)
- Le Cheval bleu (1888)
- Le Vœu d'être chaste (1900)
- Chante-pleure (1890)
- Les Antibel (1892)
- Petites âmes (1893)
- Mademoiselle Clémence (1896)
- Pays et paysages (1895)
- Petites gens (1905)
- Bernadette de Lourdes (1894), a mystery
- Le Roi de Rome (1898), a play
