= Au Maroc =

1890 travel memoir by Pierre Loti

Au Maroc (1890; "In Morocco") is a travel memoir by Pierre Loti about a month-long journey by horseback in Morocco through Tangier, Fez and Mekinez. The initial trip from Tangier to Fez was in the company of a French embassy, after which Loti continued on by himself dressed in native clothing. Au Maroc was Loti's first pure travel literature.

The book has been influential. Matisse, before coming to Morocco, studied the country by reading Loti's book. Edith Wharton’s In Morocco (1920) found its "strongest influence" in Loti's account.
