= Aziyadé =

Book by Pierre Loti

- 1936 illustrated edition
- Author: Pierre Loti
- Illustrator: Auguste Leroux (pictured edition)
- Language: French
- Published: 1879
- Publisher: Calmann-Lévy
- ISBN: 2070381471

Aziyadé (1879; also known as Constantinople) is a novel by French author Pierre Loti. Originally published anonymously, it was his first book, and along with Le Mariage de Loti (1880, also published anonymously) would introduce the author to the French public and quickly propel him to fame; because of this, his anonymous persona did not last long.

Aziyadé is semi-autobiographical, based on a diary Loti kept during a three-month period as a French Naval officer in Greece and Constantinople (now Istanbul) in the fall and winter of 1876. It tells the story of the 27-year-old Loti's illicit love affair with an 18-year-old "Circassian" harem girl named Aziyadé. Although Aziyadé was one of many conquests in the exotic romantic's life, she was his greatest love, and he would wear a gold ring with her name on it for the rest of his life. The book also describes Loti's "friendship" with a Spanish man servant named Samuel, forming a love triangle. Based on Loti's diary entries, most critics believe that some sort of homosexual affair occurred; indeed, some believe that Aziyadé never existed, and the entire work is a cover for a homosexual love story. However, others say the evidence for Aziyadé's existence seems overwhelming. The novel also describes Loti's love affair with Turkish culture, which became a central part of his "exotica" persona.

The first English translation, by Marjorie Laurie, can be found in many editions and is no longer in copyright. However, some parts have been sanitized regarding harem life, prostitution and homosexuality. A 2016 translation by William Needham is more accurate in content. The original French first edition is very rare and has become a highly prized collector's item.
