= Émile Vedel =

Writer and officer from France

Émile Vedel (born 21 August 1858 in Marseille; d. 12 February 1937 in Tahiti, French Polynesia) was a French naval officer and writer.

== Life and work ==
Émile Vedel was born in Marseille in southern France. He served in the French Navy (Marine nationale) and attained the rank of commandant (frigate captain). Vedel travelled extensively through the Far East and published several travelogues, novels, and accounts of his experiences at sea. He was a close friend of the writer Pierre Loti (1850–1923), with whom he collaborated on a French translation of Shakespeare's King Lear. Vedel authored Lumières d'Orient (Lights of the East) and other works about his journeys to India, Ceylon, China, and Cambodia. Later, he spent time in Polynesia, where he adopted Princess Takau-Pōmare. He also published books on the First World War dealing with naval warfare. His literary and maritime work made him a notable representative of French naval literature of his time.

His daughter, princess Takau-Pomaré Vedel (1887–1976), the daughter of Queen Marau Taaroa (1860–1934) and Émile Vedel, translated and published the memoirs of her mother Marau Taaroa. In 1914, he took part in the First World War. In works as Sur nos fronts de mer (On Our Seashores) (1918) the ‘commandant’ Émile Vedel recalls the war that raged along the shores of the seas.

According to the obituary by Aristide Maria, Vedel gathered an extensive collection of Tahitian folklore, which he did not have time to publish.

== Publications (in selection) ==
- "Note sur l'histoire et la religion des Polynésiens", s.d. (1891)
- Le quatrième centenaire de Vasco de Gama. Imprimerie Chaix, Paris 1898 (Extrait de la Revue de Paris, Ier, juin 1898)
- Lumières d'Orient. Paul Ollendorff 1901 (preface Pierre Loti)
- L'ile d’épouvante. Calmann-Lévy 1904

translations, etc.

- (co-translator) Le Roi Lear (William Shakespeare), with Pierre Loti. Paris, Calmann-Lévy 1904
- (translator) Troïlus et Cressida (William Shakespeare). Paris, Impr. de l'Illustration 1913
- Faust: adaptation en douze tableaux des deux Faust de Goethe. Librairie théatrale, artistique et littéraire, 1913

naval literature:

- Nos marins aux Dardanelles. L'Illustration n°3803. 1916
- Nos marins dans l'Adriatique. L'Illustration n°3874. 1917
- Nos marins à la guerre (sur mer et sur terre). Payot, Paris 1916 (content)
- Sur nos fronts de mer. Plon, 1918
- Croisière en sous-marin. L'Illustration n°3921. 1918
- Quatre années de guerre sous-marine – 5e édition. Plon-Nourrit, 1919 (content)

== See also ==
- Pierre Loti

== Bibliography ==
- Patrick O'Reilly & Édouard Reitman: Bibliographie de Tahiti et de la Polynésie française. Ouvrage publié avec le concours du Centre National de la Recherche Scientifique. Publications de la Société des Océanistes, No. 14. Musée de l'Homme, Paris 1967 (in partial view)
- Maurice Loir, Georges G.-Toudouze: Gloires et souvenirs maritimes: d'après les mémoires ou les récits de Baudin, de Bonaparte, de l'amiral P. Bouvet, du vice-amiral Garnault... (6e édition). Hachette (Paris) 1922
