= The Road to Paradise =

1930 film

- Directed by: Wilhelm Thiele; Max de Vaucorbeil
- Written by: Paul Frank; Franz Schulz; Louis Verneuil
- Starring: Lilian Harvey; Henri Garat; René Lefèvre
- Cinematography: Franz Planer
- Music by: Werner R. Heymann
- Production company: UFA
- Distributed by: L'Alliance Cinématographique Européenne
- Release date: 13 December 1930
- Running time: 98 minutes
- Country: Germany
- Language: French

The Road to Paradise (French: Le Chemin du paradis) is a 1930 German musical comedy film directed by Wilhelm Thiele and Max de Vaucorbeil and starring Lilian Harvey, Henri Garat and René Lefèvre. It was made by the German studio UFA as a simultaneous French-language version of the hit film The Three from the Filling Station. Harvey, who was fluent in three languages, reprised her own role in the French-language version also.

== Cast ==
- Lilian Harvey as Liliane Bourcart
- Henri Garat as Willy
- René Lefèvre as Jean
- Jacques Maury as Guy
- Gaston Jacquet as Monsieur Bourcart
- Olga Chekhova as Édith de Tourkoff
- Hubert Daix as Maitre Dupont-Belleville
- Jean Boyer as the bailiff
- Lewis Ruth as Orchestra Leader / Himself
- Comedian Harmonists as Themselves

== Bibliography ==
- O'Brien, Charles. Cinema's Conversion to Sound: Technology and Film Style in France and the U.S.. Indiana University Press, 2005.
