= Madame Chrysanthème (novel) =

1887 novel by Pierre Loti

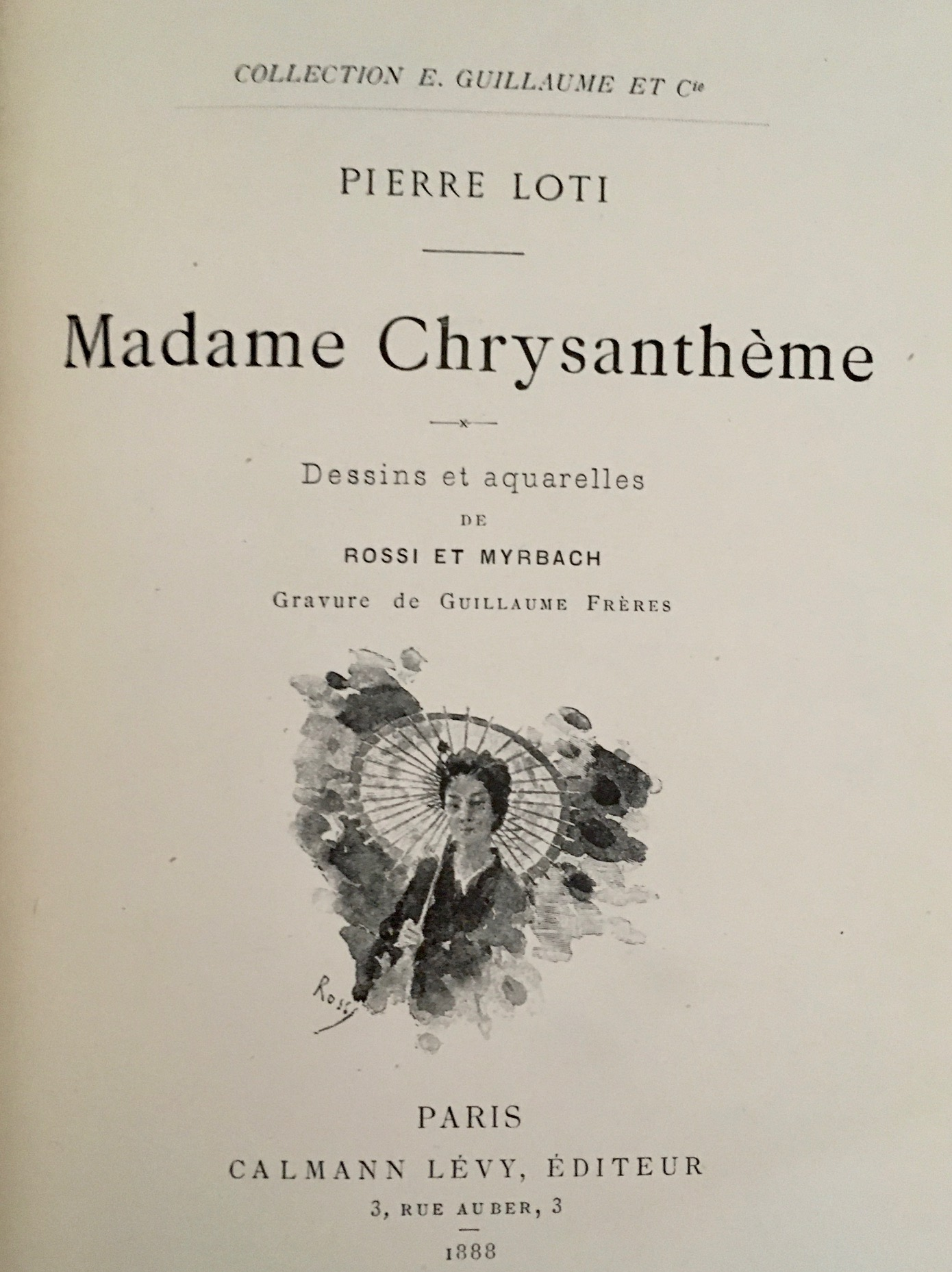
- Title page for the first edition
- Author: Pierre Loti
- Language: French
- Set in: Meiji Japan
- Publication date: 1887

Madame Chrysanthème is a semi-autobiographical 1887 novel by Pierre Loti, presented as the journal of a naval officer who was temporarily married to a Japanese woman while he was stationed in Nagasaki, Japan. The French-language novel was very successful internationally, running to 25 editions in the first five years of its publication with translations into several languages including English. It has been considered a key text in shaping Western attitudes toward Japan at the turn of the 20th century.

The book closely follows the journal Loti kept of one-month paid relationship with Kiku ("Chrysanthemum") in the Jūzenji (十善寺) neighbourhood (modern day Jūninmachi (十人町)) in 1885. It is known in Japan under the title of お菊さん (O Kiku-san), a direct translation of the French name. The book's success is illustrative of the Japonisme craze that swept across Western Europe in the late 19th century. Loti's novel has been criticized in Japan for belittling or deriding many traditional aspects of Japanese culture.

André Messager's 1893 opera Madame Chrysanthème is based on the novel, as are some aspects of Puccini's 1904 opera Madama Butterfly. The Geisha (1896) is also heavily indebted to Loti's book.

== The first edition ==
After the novel's serialization in Le Figaro, Madame Chrysanthème was published in book form in late 1887 (although the title page indicated 1888). This first edition was one of the earliest commercial successes of gillotage (zincography) and advanced photographic etching. By the mid-1880s, advances in technology made it unnecessary to hire a master wood-carver to painstakingly turn a painting into a block (as had been done for centuries). With the advent of new technology, these blocks could be locked into the printing press side-by-side with the lead type, allowing text and imagery to be printed simultaneously on the same sheet of paper.

A 1887 illustration by Luigi Rossi

Instead of sitting behind a strict square frame, the illustrations by Luigi Rossi and Felician Myrbach, some of them in color, were designed as vignettes — drawings with soft edges that faded directly into the paper. The text wrapped seamlessly around the shapes of the figures: a character's umbrella might slice through a line of dialogue, or the trailing leaves of a bamboo tree would creep out from the margin to underline a paragraph.

The book was a flagship release for Édouard Guillaume’s collection of editions. Guillaume’s explicit vision was to reinvent the book as an artistic object where the typography and the illustration interacted dynamically. He wanted the images to mirror the flow of reading, functioning like visual punctuation marks. The concept of wrapping text around organic, unframed shapes was heavily inspired by Japanese e-hon (illustrated books) and scroll paintings, where text and calligraphy effortlessly coexisted in the same visual field. The resulting layout directly paved the way for the flowing, nature-integrated text designs of the Art Nouveau movement just a few years later.

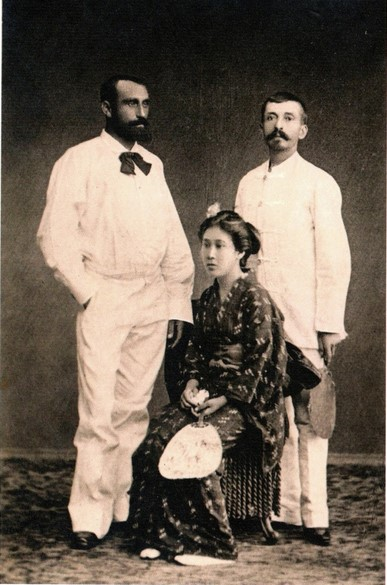
Pierre Le Cor, Pierre Loti and Loti's "temporary wife" Okane-San in Japan (1885)

For millions of Westerners who had never seen Asia, Loti's book, with its depictions of kimonos, paper walls, and lanterns, defined what Japan looked like. The book also popularized the word "mousmé" (Loti's transcription of the Japanese word musume), which became a specific trope in Western art representing a young, delicate, and exoticized Japanese woman. While Vincent Van Gogh lived in Arles, his letters to his brother Theo show how heavily he leaned on Guillaume’s edition of Madame Chrysanthème to craft his own idealized vision of Japanese life (as evidenced in such paintings as La Mousmé).
