= An Iceland Fisherman =

1886 novel by Pierre Loti

An Iceland Fisherman (French: Pêcheur d'Islande, 1886) is a novel by French author Pierre Loti. It depicts the romantic but inevitably sad life of Breton fishermen who sail each summer season to the stormy Iceland cod grounds. Literary critic Edmund Gosse characterized it as "the most popular and finest of all [Loti's] writings."

Loti's style is a combination of the French realist school, which included writers such as Émile Zola, and a form of literary impressionism. As Jules Cambon says, Loti wrote at a "..time when M. Zola and his school stood at the head of the literary movement. There breathed forth from Loti's writings an all-penetrating fragrance of poesy [literature using poetic devices], which liberated French literary ideals from the heavy and oppressive yoke of the Naturalistic school." Loti uses a simple vocabulary, "but these words, as used by him, take on a value we did not know they possessed; they awaken sensations that linger deeply within us." The characters are humble and simple working-class people, the incidents are normal every day affairs, dealing with the themes of love and separation.

Loti's greatest strength is in the depictions of nature, placing it center stage, as Cambon says:

He writes with extreme simplicity, and is not averse to the use of vague and indefinite expressions. And yet the wealth and precision of Gautier's and Hugo's language fail to endow their landscapes with the striking charm and intense life which are to be found in those of Loti. I can find no other reason for this than that which I have suggested above: the landscape, in Hugo's and in Gautier's scenes, is a background and nothing more; while Loti makes it the predominating figure of his drama. Our sensibilities are necessarily aroused before this apparition of Nature, blind, inaccessible, and all-powerful as the Fates of old.

It was adapted for the stage by Louis Tiercelin with music by Guy Ropartz. Another work based on the same novel was the 30-minute symphonic poem Nordland-Rhapsodie (Nordic Rhapsody) for large orchestra written by Austrian composer Joseph Marx in 1929. The novel has been filmed three times, most notably in 1959 by French director Pierre Schoendoerffer.

It's also quoted and referenced as inspiration in the 2015 movie Radiant Sea.
