= Impressionism in music =

Movement in Western classical music

Impressionism in music was a movement among various composers in Western classical music, mainly during the late 19th and the early 20th centuries. It focuses on mood and atmosphere, "conveying the moods and emotions aroused by the subject rather than a detailed tone‐picture." "Impressionism" is a philosophical and aesthetic term that was borrowed from a style of late 19th-century French painting that started with Claude Monet's Impression, Sunrise. Composers were labeled Impressionists by analogy to the Impressionist painters, who used starkly contrasting colors, effect of light on an object, blurry foreground and background, flattening perspective, etc. to make the observer focus their attention on the overall impression.

The most prominent feature in musical Impressionism is the use of "color" or, in musical terms, timbre, which can be achieved through orchestration, harmonic usage, texture, etc. Other elements of musical Impressionism also involve new chord combinations, ambiguous tonality, extended harmonies, use of modes and exotic scales, parallel motion, extra-musicality, and evocative titles such as “Reflets dans l'eau” (“Reflections on the water”), “Brouillards” (“Mists”), etc.

== History ==
Claude Debussy and Maurice Ravel are two leading figures in Impressionism though Debussy rejected the label (in a 1908 letter to Jacques Durand he wrote "imbeciles call [what I am trying to write in Images] 'impressionism', a term employed with the utmost inaccuracy, especially by art critics who use it as a label to stick on Turner, the finest creator of mystery in the whole of art!") and Ravel displayed discomfort with it and at one point claimed that it could not be adequately applied to music at all.

Debussy's Impressionist works typically "evoke a mood, feeling, atmosphere, or scene" by creating musical images through characteristic motifs, harmony, non-diatonic scales (such as whole-tone and pentatonic scales), instrumental timbre, large unresolved chords (e.g., 9ths, 11ths, 13ths), parallel motion, ambiguous tonality, chromaticism, heavy use of the piano pedals, and other elements. “The perception of Debussy’s compositional language as decidedly post-romantic/Impressionistic—nuanced, understated, and subtle—is firmly solidified among today’s musicians and well-informed audiences." Some Impressionist composers, Debussy and Ravel in particular, are also labeled as symbolist composers. One trait shared with both aesthetic trends is "a sense of detached observation: rather than expressing deeply felt emotion or telling a story." As in symbolist poetry, the normal syntax is usually disrupted, and individual images that carry the work's meaning are evoked.

In 1912, the French composer Ernest Fanelli (1860–1917) received significant attention and coverage in the Parisian press following a performance of a symphonic poem he wrote in 1886, titled Thèbes, incorporating elements associated with Impressionism, such as extended chords and whole-tone scales. Ravel was unimpressed by Fanelli's novelties and maintained that they had been used by composers such as Franz Liszt. He also opined that Fanelli's Impressionism stemmed from Hector Berlioz, rather than from Liszt or Russian composers.

Other composers linked to Impressionism include Lili Boulanger, Isaac Albéniz, Frederick Delius, Paul Dukas, Alexander Scriabin, Manuel de Falla, John Alden Carpenter, Ottorino Respighi, Albert Roussel, Karol Szymanowski, Charles Tomlinson Griffes, and Federico Mompou. The Finnish composer Jean Sibelius is also associated with Impressionism, and his tone poem The Swan of Tuonela (1893) predates Debussy's Prélude à l'après-midi d'un faune (regarded as a seminal work of musical Impressionism) by a year. The American composer Howard Hanson also borrowed from both Sibelius and Impressionism generally in works such as his Second Symphony.

== Characteristics ==
One of the most important tools of musical Impressionism was tensionless harmony. The dissonance of chords was not resolved but was used as timbre. The chords were often shifted parallel. In the melodic field, the whole tone scale, the pentatonic, and the modal scales were used. The melodics were characterized by their circular melodic movements. The timbre became the stylistic device of Impressionism instead of concise themes or other traditional forms.

== See also ==
- History of music
