= Pierre Loti =

French naval officer, novelist, and Turkophile

Louis Marie-Julien Viaud
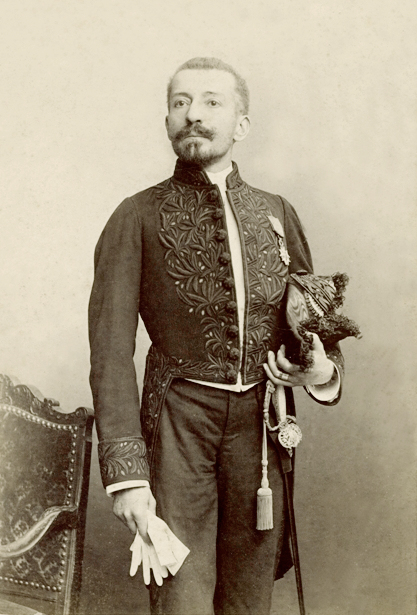
- Pierre Loti on the day of his reception at the Académie Française, 7 April 1892
- Born: 14 January 1850; Rochefort, Charente-Maritime, France
- Died: 10 June 1923 (aged 73); Hendaye, France
- Occupations: French navy officer, novelist
- Writing career
- Pen name: Pierre Loti

Pierre Loti (French: [pjɛʁ lɔti]; pseudonym of Louis Marie-Julien Viaud [lwi maʁi ʒyljɛ̃ vjo]; 14 January 1850 – 10 June 1923) was a French naval officer and novelist, known for his exotic novels and short stories.

== Biography ==
Born to a Protestant family, Loti's education began in his birthplace, Rochefort, Charente-Maritime. At age 17 he entered the naval school in Brest and studied at Le Borda. He gradually rose in his profession, attaining the rank of captain in 1906. In January 1910 he went on the reserve list. He was in the habit of claiming that he never read books, saying to the Académie Française on the day of his introduction (7 April 1892), "Loti ne sait pas lire" ("Loti doesn't know how to read"), but testimony from friends proves otherwise, as does his library, much of which is preserved in his house in Rochefort. In 1876 fellow naval officers persuaded him to turn into a novel passages in his diary dealing with some curious experiences in Istanbul. The result was the anonymously published Aziyadé (1879), part romance, part autobiography, like the work of his admirer, Marcel Proust, after him.

Loti proceeded to the South Seas as part of his naval training, living in Papeete, Tahiti for two months in 1872, where he "went native". Several years later he published the Polynesian idyll originally titled Rarahu (1880), which was reprinted as Le Mariage de Loti, the first book to introduce him to the wider public. His narrator explains that the name Loti was bestowed on him by the natives, after his mispronunciation of "roti" (a red flower). The book inspired the 1883 opera Lakmé by Léo Delibes. Loti Bain, a shallow pool at the base of the Fautaua Falls, is named for Loti.

This was followed by Le Roman d'un spahi (1881), a record of the melancholy adventures of a soldier in Senegal. In 1882, Loti issued a collection of four shorter pieces, three stories and a travel piece, under the general title of Fleurs d'ennui (Flowers of Boredom).

In 1883 Loti achieved a wider public spotlight. First, he published the critically acclaimed Mon Frère Yves (My Brother Yves), a novel describing the life of a French naval officer (Pierre Loti), and a Breton sailor (Yves Kermadec, inspired by Loti companion Pierre le Cor), described by Edmund Gosse as "one of his most characteristic productions". Second, while serving in Tonkin (northern Vietnam) as a naval officer aboard the ironclad Atalante, Loti published three articles in the newspaper Le Figaro in September and October 1883 about atrocities that occurred during the Battle of Thuận An (20 August 1883), an attack by the French on the Vietnamese coastal defenses of Hue. He was threatened with suspension from the service for this indiscretion, thus gaining wider public notoriety. In 1884 his friend Émile Pouvillon dedicated his novel L'Innocent to Loti.

In 1886 Loti published a novel of life among the Breton fisherfolk, called Pêcheur d'Islande (An Iceland Fisherman), which Edmund Gosse characterized as "the most popular and finest of all his writings." It shows Loti adapting some of the Impressionist techniques of contemporary painters, especially Monet, to prose, and is a classic of French literature. In 1887 he brought out a volume "of extraordinary merit, which has not received the attention it deserves", Propos d'exil, a series of short studies of exotic places, in his characteristic semi-autobiographic style. Madame Chrysanthème, a novel of Japanese manners that is a precursor to Madama Butterfly and Miss Saigon, was published the same year.

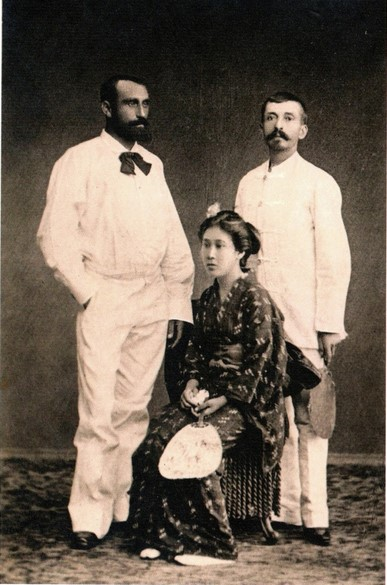
Loti (right) with "Chrysanthème" and Pierre le Cor in Japan, 1885.

In 1890 Loti published Au Maroc, the record of a journey to Fez in company with a French embassy, and Le Roman d'un enfant (The Story of a Child), a somewhat fictionalized recollection of Loti's childhood that would greatly influence Marcel Proust. A collection of "strangely confidential and sentimental reminiscences", called Le Livre de la pitié et de la mort (The Book of Pity and Death) was published in 1891.

Loti was aboard ship at the port of Algiers when news reached him of his election, on 21 May 1891, to the Académie Française. In 1892 he published Fantôme d'orient, a short novel derived from a subsequent trip to Constantinople, less a continuation of Aziyadé than a commentary on it. He described a visit to the Holy Land in three volumes, The Desert, Jerusalem, and Galilee, (1895–1896), and wrote a novel, Ramuntcho (1897), a story of contraband runners in the Basque province. In 1898 he collected his later essays as Figures et Choses qui passaient (Passing Figures and Things).

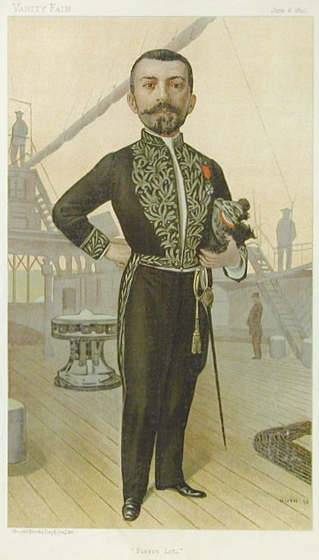
Loti caricatured by Guth for Vanity Fair, 1895

In 1899 and 1900 Loti visited British India, with the view of describing what he saw; the result appeared in 1903 in L'Inde (sans les anglais) (India (without the English)). During the autumn of 1900 he went to China as part of the international expedition sent to combat the Boxer Rebellion. He described what he saw there after the siege of Peking in Les Derniers Jours de Pékin (The Last Days of Peking, 1902).

Loti's later publications include: La Troisième jeunesse de Mme Prune (The Third Youth of Mrs. Plum, 1905), which resulted from a return visit to Japan and once again hovers between narrative and travelog; Les Désenchantées (The Unawakened, 1906); La Mort de Philae (The Death of Philae, 1908), recounting a trip to Egypt; Judith Renaudin (produced at the Théâtre Antoine, 1898), a five-act historical play that Loti presented as based on an episode in his family history; and, in collaboration with Emile Vedel, a translation of William Shakespeare's King Lear, produced at the Théâtre Antoine in 1904. Les Désenchantées, which concerned women of the Turkish harem, was based like many of Loti's books, on fact. It has, however, become clear that Loti was in fact the victim of a hoax by three prosperous Turkish women.

In 1912 at the Century Theatre in New York City, Loti mounted a production of The Daughter of Heaven, a George Egerton adaptation of his French play La fille du ciel, commissioned in March 1903 by Sarah Bernhardt, written in collaboration with Judith Gautier and published in 1911. The play was never performed in France, since apparently Bernhardt lost interest when she learned she would have to wear a black wig over her red hair. In New York the title role was performed by Viola Allen.

He died in 1923 in Hendaye and was interred on the island of Oléron with a state funeral.

Loti was an inveterate collector and his marriage into wealth helped him support this habit. His house in Rochefort, a remarkable reworking of two adjacent bourgeois row houses, is preserved as a museum. One elaborately tiled room is an Orientalist fantasia of a mosque, including a small fountain and five ceremoniously draped coffins containing desiccated bodies. Another room evokes a medieval banqueting hall. Loti's own bedroom is rather like a monk's cell, but mixes Christian, Persian and Muslim religious artifacts. The courtyard described in The Story of a Child, with the fountain built for him by his older brother, is still there. There is also a museum in Istanbul named after him located on a hill where Loti used to spend his free time during his sojourn in Turkey.

== Works ==
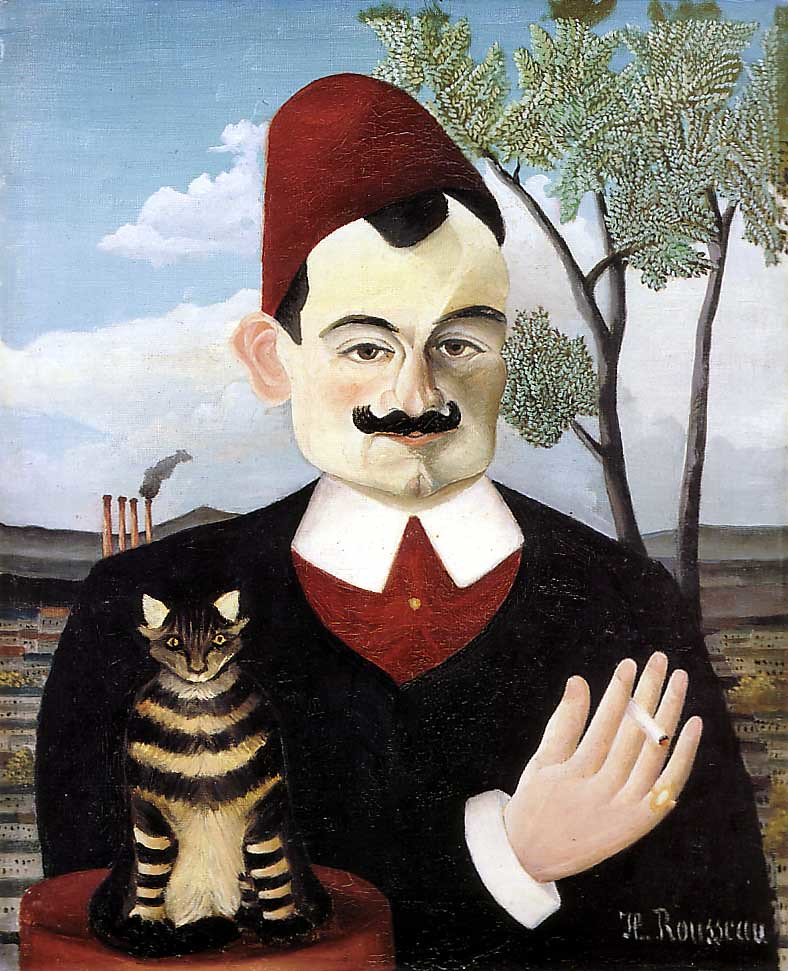
Portrait of Pierre Loti by Henri Rousseau, 1891

Contemporary critic Edmund Gosse gave the following assessment of his work:

At his best Pierre Loti was unquestionably the finest descriptive writer of the day. In the delicate exactitude with which he reproduced the impression given to his own alert nerves by unfamiliar forms, colors, sounds and perfumes, he was without a rival. But he was not satisfied with this exterior charm; he desired to blend with it a moral sensibility of the extremest refinement, at once sensual and ethereal. Many of his best books are long sobs of remorseful memory, so personal, so intimate, that an English reader is amazed to find such depth of feeling compatible with the power of minutely and publicly recording what is felt. In spite of the beauty and melody and fragrance of Loti's books his mannerisms are apt to pall upon the reader, and his later books of pure description were rather empty. His greatest successes were gained in the species of confession, half-way between fact and fiction, which he essayed in his earlier books. When all his limitations, however, have been rehearsed, Pierre Loti remains, in the mechanism of style and cadence, one of the most original and most perfect French writers of the second half of the 19th century.

== Bibliography ==
- Aziyadé (1879)
- Le Mariage de Loti (originally titled Rarahu (1880))
- Le Roman d'un spahi (1881)
- Fleurs d'ennui (1882)
- Mon Frère Yves (1883) (English translation My Brother Yves)
- Les Trois Dames de la Kasbah (1884), which first appeared as part of Fleurs d'Ennui
- Pêcheur d'Islande (1886) (English translation An Iceland Fisherman)
- Madame Chrysanthème (1887)
- Propos d'Exil (1887)
- Japoneries d'Automne (1889)
- Au Maroc (1890)
- Le Roman d'un enfant (1890)
- Le Livre de la pitié et de la mort (1891)
- Fantôme d'Orient (1892)
- L'Exilée (1893)
- Matelot (1893)
- Le Désert (1895)
- Jérusalem (1895)
- La Galilée (1895)
- Ramuntcho (1897)
- Figures et choses qui passaient (1898)
- Judith Renaudin (1898)
- Reflets sur la sombre route (1899)
- Les Derniers Jours de Pékin (1902)
- L'Inde (sans les Anglais) (1903)
- Vers Ispahan (1904)
- La Troisième Jeunesse de Madame Prune (1905)
- Les Désenchantées (1906)
- La Mort de Philae (1909)
- Le Château de la Belle au Bois dormant (1910)
- Un Pèlerin d'Angkor (1912)
- Turquie Agonisante (1913). An English translation, Turkey in Agony, was published in the same year.
- La Hyène enragée (1916)
- Quelques aspects du vertige Mondial (1917)
- L'Horreur allemande (1918)
- Les massacres d'Arménie (1918)
- Prime Jeunesse (1919)
- La Mort de notre chère France en Orient (1920)
- Suprêmes Visions d'Orient (1921), written with the help of his son Samuel Viaud
- Un Jeune Officier pauvre (1923, posthumous)
- Lettres à Juliette Adam (1924, posthumous)
- Journal intime (1878–1885), 2 vol (private diary, 1925–1929, posthumous)
- Correspondence inédite (unpublished correspondence from 1865 to 1904, 1929, posthumous)

== Filmography ==
- Le Roman d'un spahi, directed by Henri Pouctal (1914, based on the novel Le Roman d'un spahi)
- Pêcheur d'Islande, directed by Henri Pouctal (1915, short film, based on the novel Pêcheur d'Islande)
- Ramuntcho, directed by Jacques de Baroncelli (1919, short film, based on the novel Ramuntcho)
- Pêcheur d'Islande, directed by Jacques de Baroncelli (1924, based on the novel Pêcheur d'Islande)
- Pêcheur d'Islande, directed by Pierre Guerlais (1934, based on the novel Pêcheur d'Islande)
- Le Roman d'un spahi, directed by Michel Bernheim (1936, based on the novel Le Roman d'un spahi)
- Ramuntcho, directed by René Barberis (1938, based on the novel Ramuntcho)
- The Marriage of Ramuntcho, directed by Max de Vaucorbeil (1947, based on the novel Ramuntcho)
- Ramuntcho, directed by Pierre Schoendoerffer (1959, based on the novel Ramuntcho)
- Pêcheur d'Islande, directed by Pierre Schoendoerffer (1959, based on the novel Pêcheur d'Islande)

== Honours and awards ==
- Knight of the Order of Legion of Honour (1887)
- Officer of the Order of Legion of Honour (1898)
- Commander of the Order of Legion of Honour (1910)
- Grand Officer of the Order of Legion of Honour (1914)
- Grand Cross of the Order of Legion of Honour (1921)
- Commander of the Order of Franz Joseph

== Sources ==
- Berrong, Richard M. (2013). Putting Monet and Rembrandt into Words: Pierre Loti's Recreation and Theorization of Claude Monet's Impressionism and Rembrandt's Landscapes in Literature. Chapel Hill: North Carolina Studies in Romance Language and Literature. vol 301.
- Aldrich, Robert (2002). Who's Who in Gay and Lesbian History from Antiquity to World War II. Routledge; London. ISBN 0-415-15983-0.
- Lesley Blanch (UK:1982, US:1983). Pierre Loti: Portrait of an Escapist. US: ISBN 978-0-15-171931-0 / UK: ISBN 978-0-00-211649-7 – paperback re-print as Pierre Loti: Travels with the Legendary Romantic (2004) ISBN 978-1-85043-429-0
- Edmund B. D'Auvergne (2002). Pierre Loti: The Romance of a Great Writer. Kessinger Publishing. ISBN 978-1-4325-7394-2 (paper), ISBN 978-0-7103-0864-1 (hardcover).
- Ömer Koç, 'The Cruel Hoaxing of Pierre Loti' Cornucopia, Issue 3, 1992
