= Henriette Henriot =

French actress and model (1857–1944)

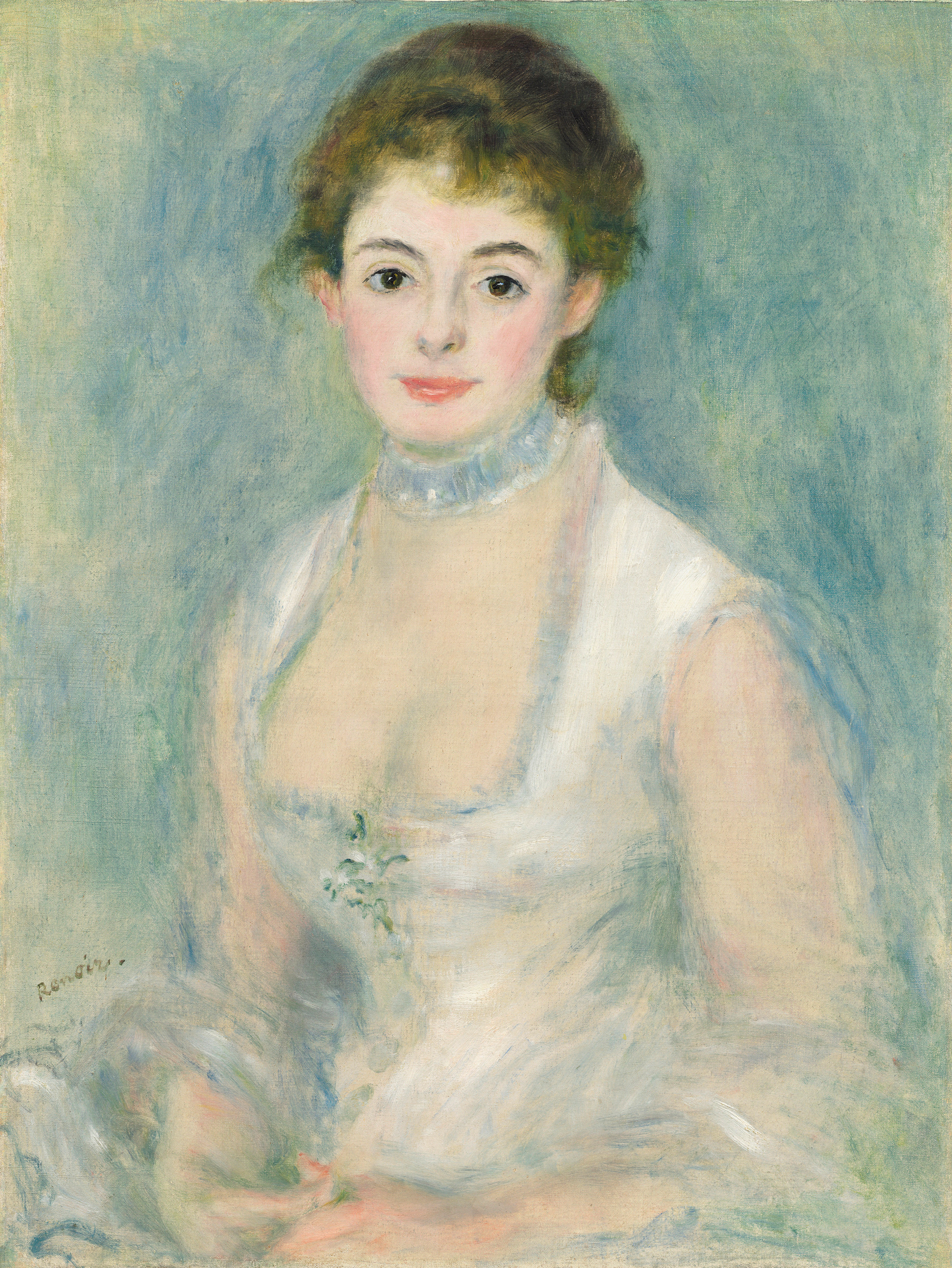
- Henriette Henriot c. 1876 by Pierre-Auguste Renoir
- Born: Marie Henriette Alphonsine Grossin; 14 November 1857
- Died: 17 March 1944 (aged 86)
- Resting place: Passy Cemetery, 16th arrondissement of Paris; 48°51′45″N 2°17′07″E
- Other names: Mademoiselle Henriot, Madame Henriot
- Education: Conservatoire de musique et de déclamation
- Occupations: Actress and model
- Known for: Model in Renoir's painting La Parisienne
- Children: 1 (Jane Henriot)
- Mother: Aline Grossin

Henriette Henriot, born Marie Henriette Alphonsine Grossin (English: /ɒ̃ˈriːoʊ/ ahn-REE-oh, French: [ɑ̃ʁjɛt ɑ̃ʁjo]; 14 November 1857 – 17 March 1944) was an Actor and a favourite model of the French artist Renoir from about 1874–1876. She is known for the model in his painting La Parisienne on display at the National Museum, Cardiff.

Henriot, the daughter of Aline Grossin, a milliner, attended the Conservatoire de musique et de déclamation in Paris in 1872, where she studied acting. She was still using her birth name of Marie Henriette Alphonsine Grossin, and it was not until 1874 that she started to use her stage names of Henriette Henriot, Mademoiselle Henriot, and Madame Henriot, names which emerged when she was appearing in acting roles at the Théâtre de l'Ambigu-Comique. Henriot also started modelling for Renoir, alongside the minor parts she performed at the Théâtre de l'Odéon, Théâtre Libre and Théâtre de l'Ambigu-Comique.

Grave of Henriette Henriot and her daughter Jane
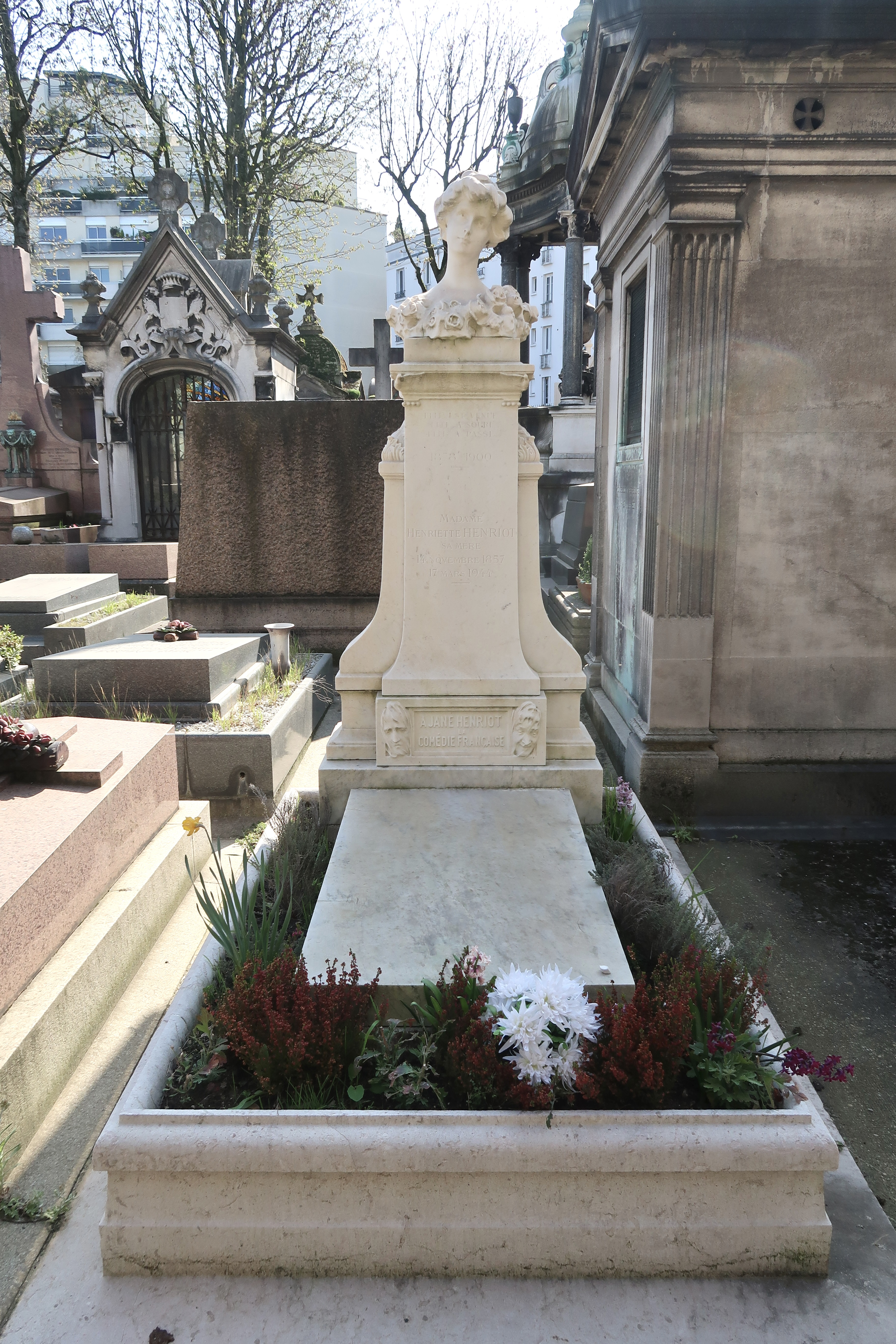
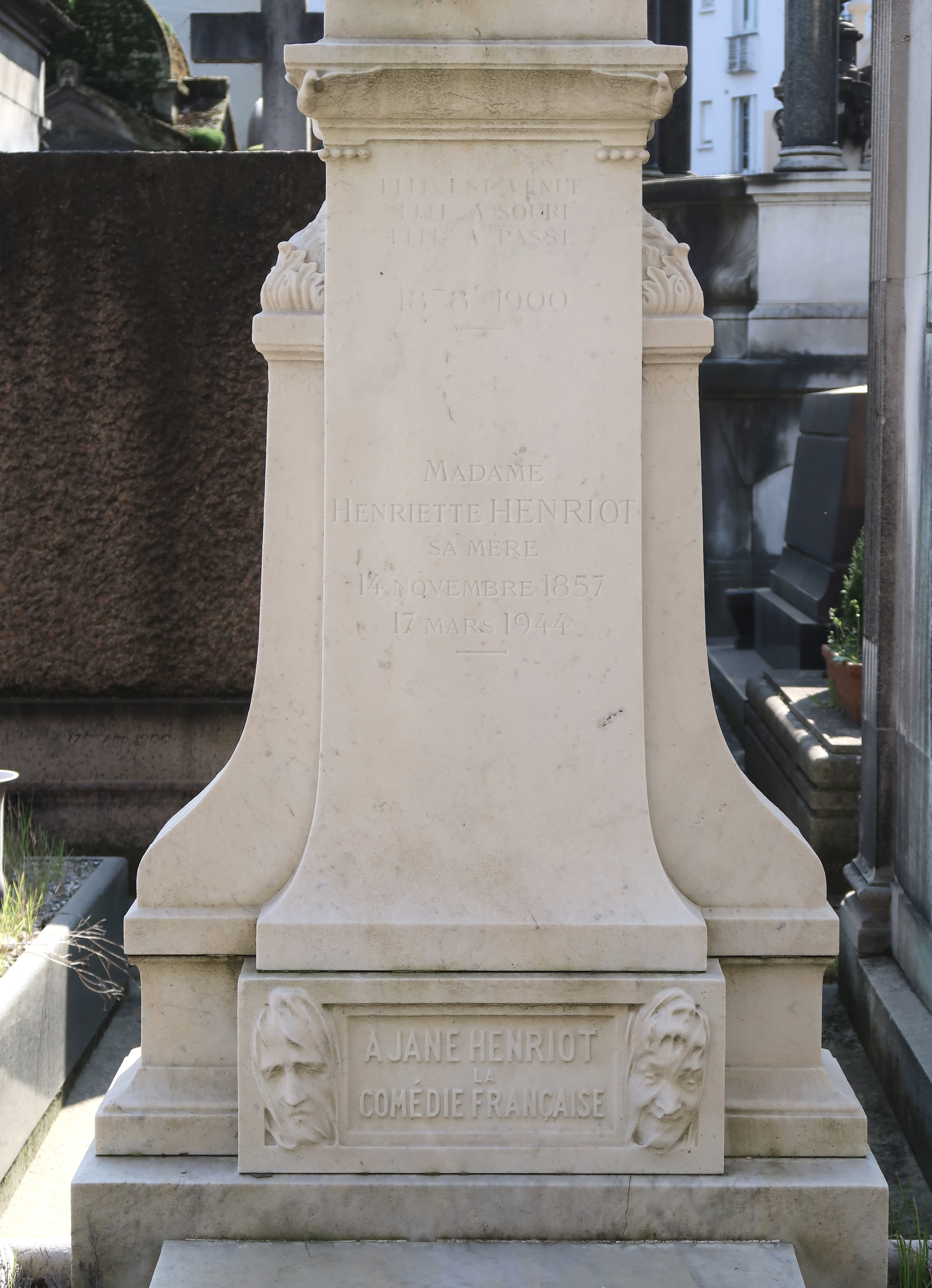

Colin Bailey, formerly of the Frick Collection, said in an exhibition catalogue in 2012:

Between 1874 and 1876 Henriot modelled for five of Renoir's most ambitious full-length pictures and at least seven smaller works. She appears fully and fashionably dressed in La Parisienne, draped and damp in La Source; seated in the shade with a suitor in the Lovers; in Troubadour costume in The Page, and as the protective elder sister in La Promenade.

Although it is not known whether Renoir ever paid Henriot for modelling, he did give her two paintings, including the last painting he made of her: A Vase of Flowers. Renoir had become close friends with Henriot during this time, so much so that he also painted her daughter, Jeanne Angèle Grossin (1878–1900) who modelled for him in Fillette au chapeau bleu (Little girl in blue hat). Jeanne was killed in a theater fire in 1900, when she was 21.

== Stage career ==
The following is a selection of plays that Henriot acted in:

- 1875 Le Fils du Diable by Paul Féval
- 1975 La Vénus by Gordes d'Adolphe Belot
- 1975 Le Fils de Chopart by Jules Dornay
- 1877 Pépite
- 1882 Une aventure de Garrick by Fabrice Labrousse
- 1883 La Famille d'Armelles by Jean Marras
- 1883 Sganarelle by Molière
- 1894 La Belle Limonadière by Paul Mahalin
- 1895 L'Argent by Émile Fabre directed by André Antoine
- 1898 Mon enfant by Ambroise Janvier
- 1902 Nini l'assommeur by Maurice Bernhardt
- 1904 Le Bercail by Henri Bernstein
- 1905 La Rafale (Whirlwind) by Henri Bernstein
- 1908 Le Petit Fouchard by Charles Raymond
- 1908 Le Passe-partout by Georges Thurner
- 1909 Pierre et Thérèse by Marcel Prévost
- 1912 La Crise by Paul Bourget
- 1912 Le Mystère de la chambre jaune by Gaston Leroux
- 1914 Monsieur Brotonneau by Robert de Flers

== Modelling career ==
Selection of portraits by Pierre-Auguste Renoir
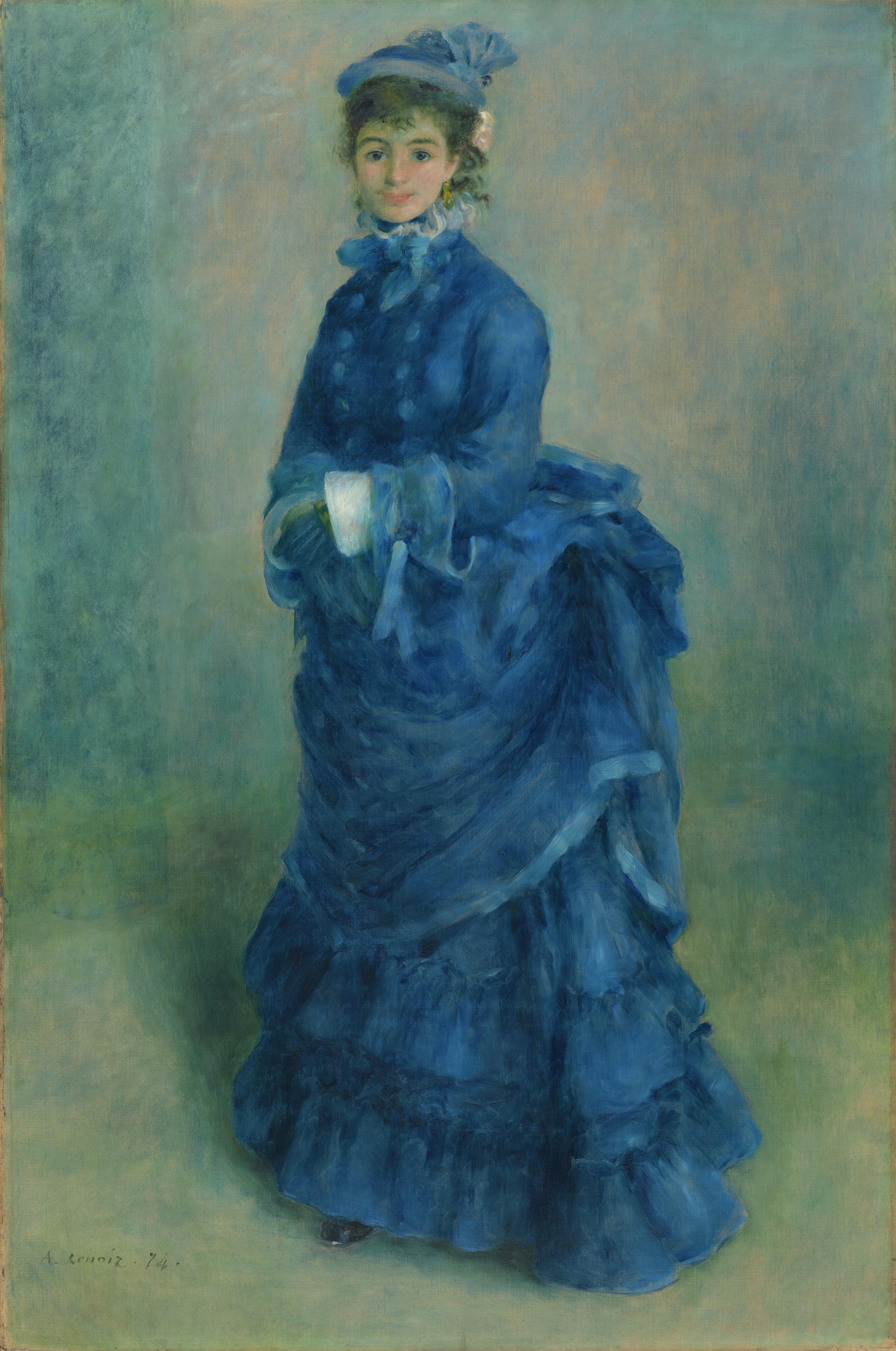
La Parisienne
also known as La Dame en Bleu
English: The Blue Lady (1874)

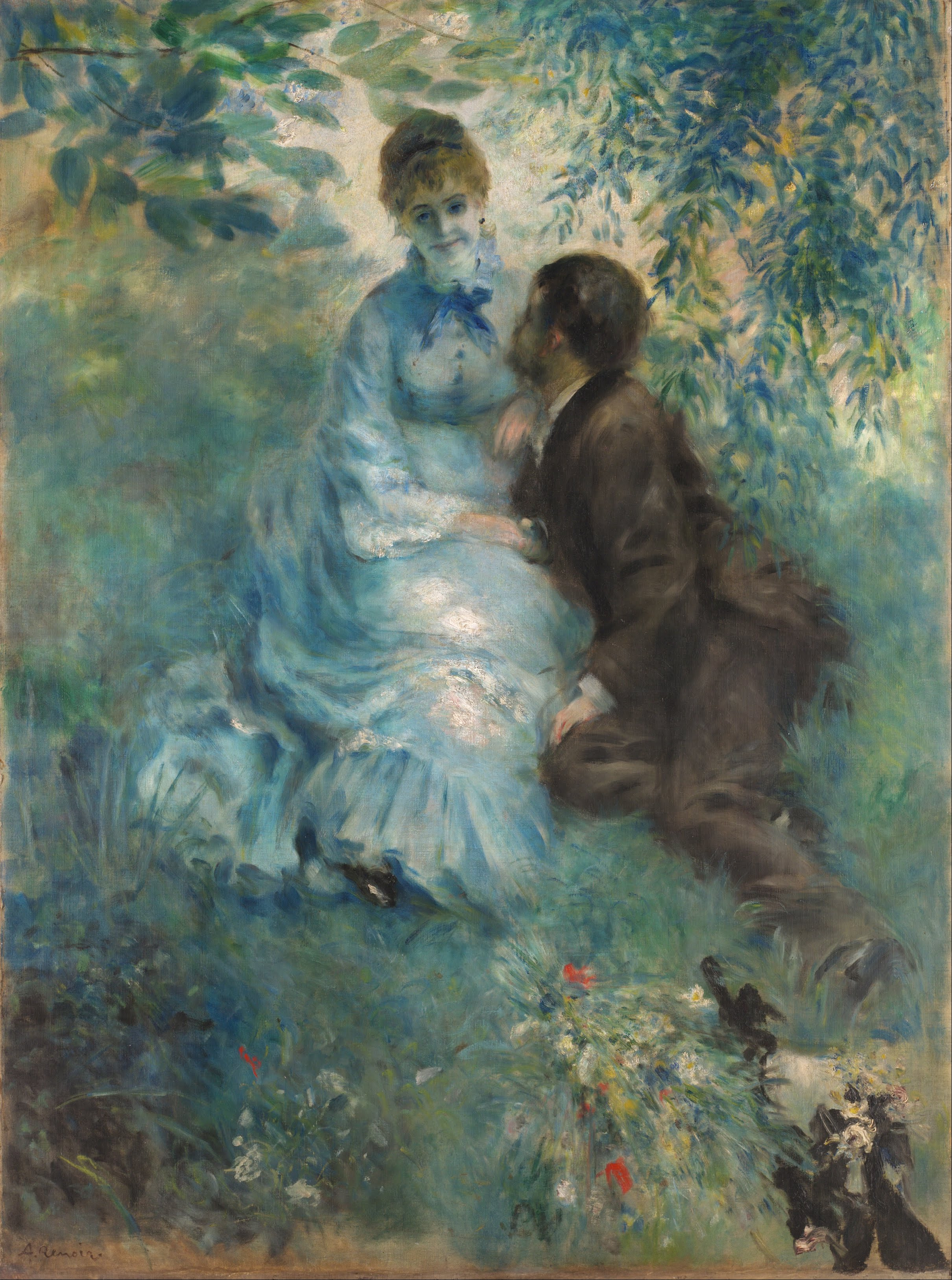
Lovers
(1875)

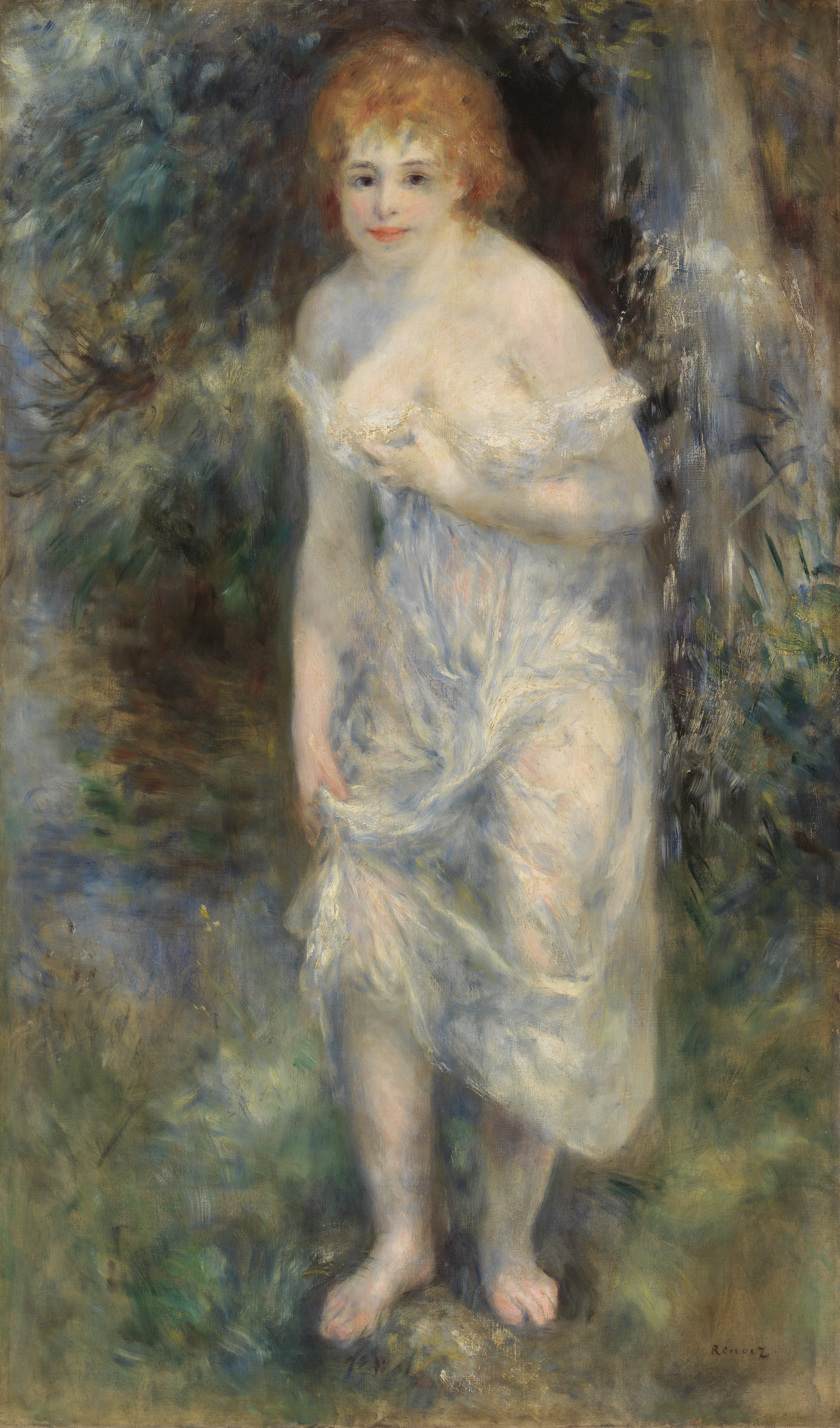
La Source
(1875)

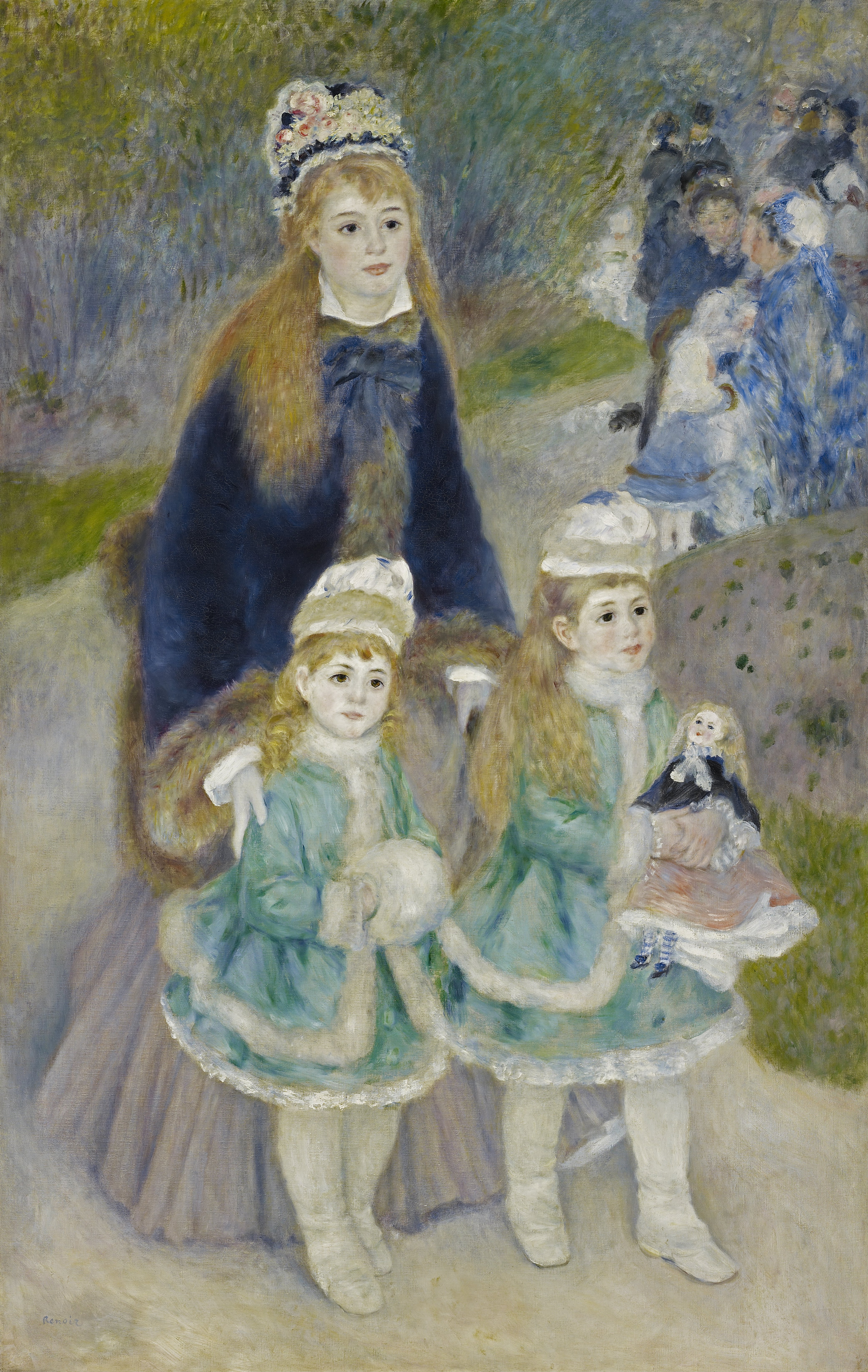
Mother and Children
also known as La Promenade
(1876)

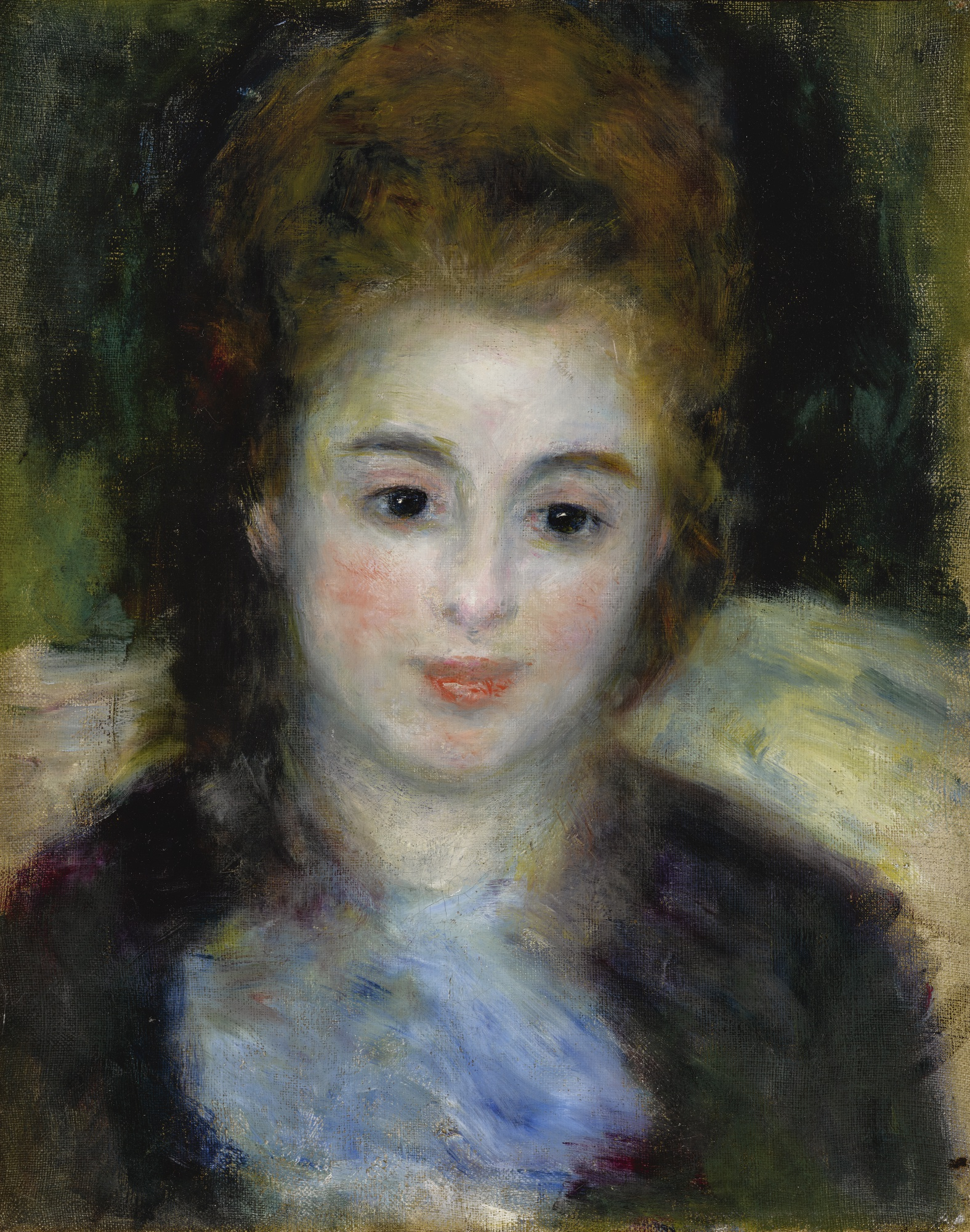
Mademoiselle Henriot ou jeune fille au ruban bleu
English: Miss Henriot or young girl with blue ribbon
(1876)

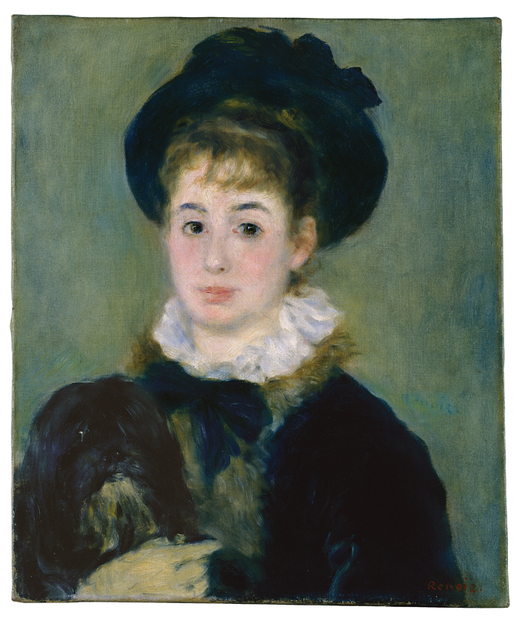
Portrait of Henriette Henriot
(1876)

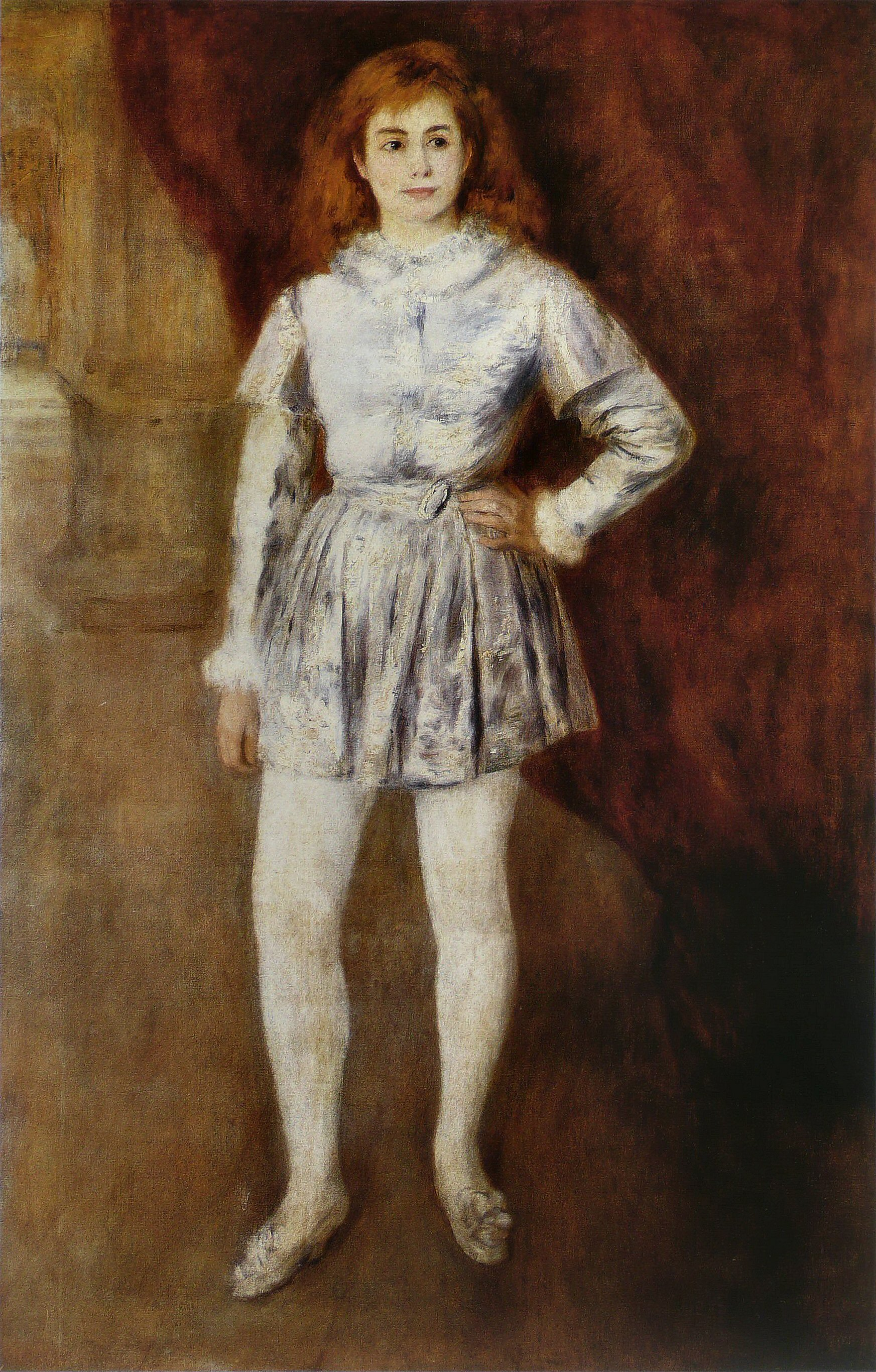
Madame Henriot 'en travesti' (the Page)
(1877)

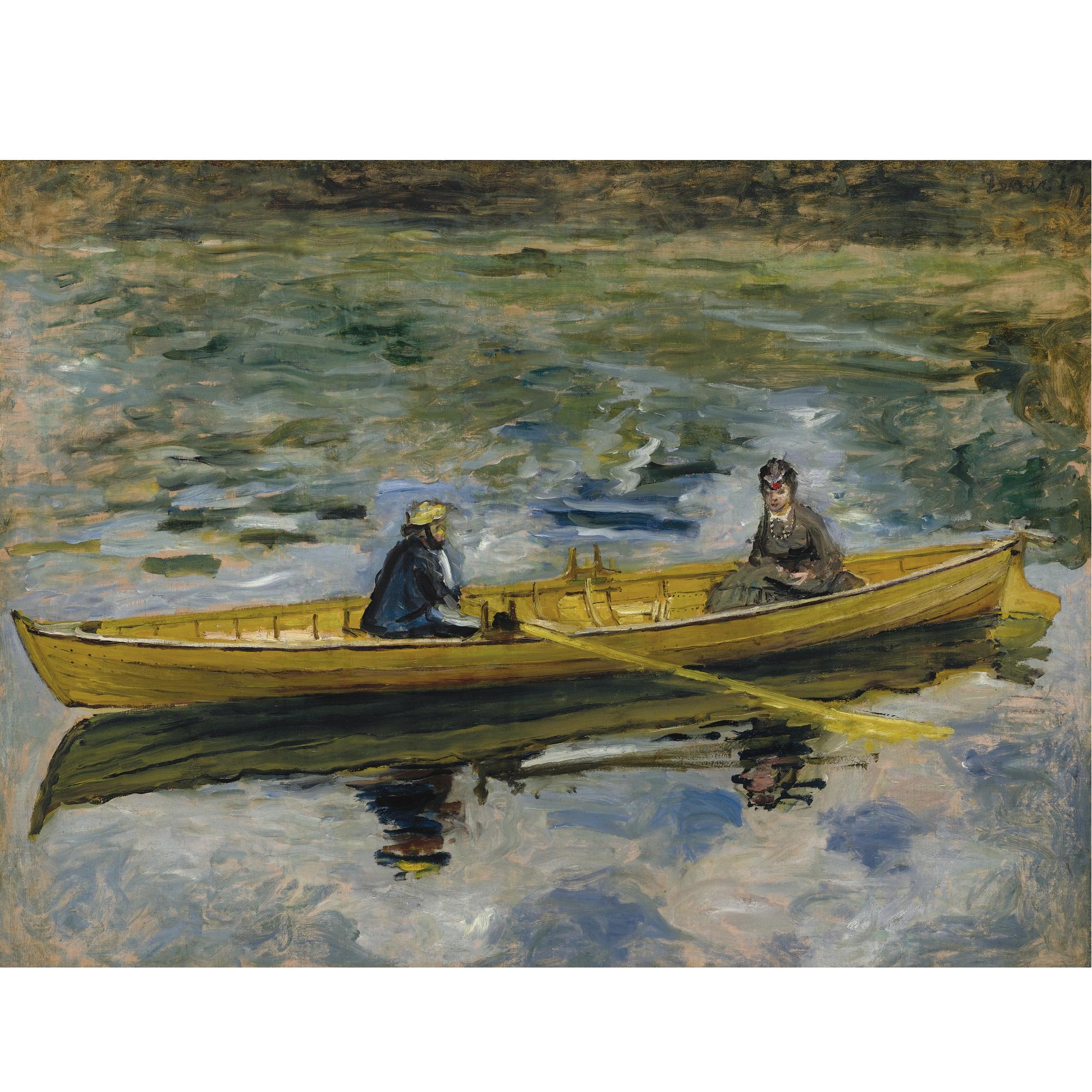
Claude Monet Et Mme Henriot
English: Claude Monet and Madame Henriot
(1880)

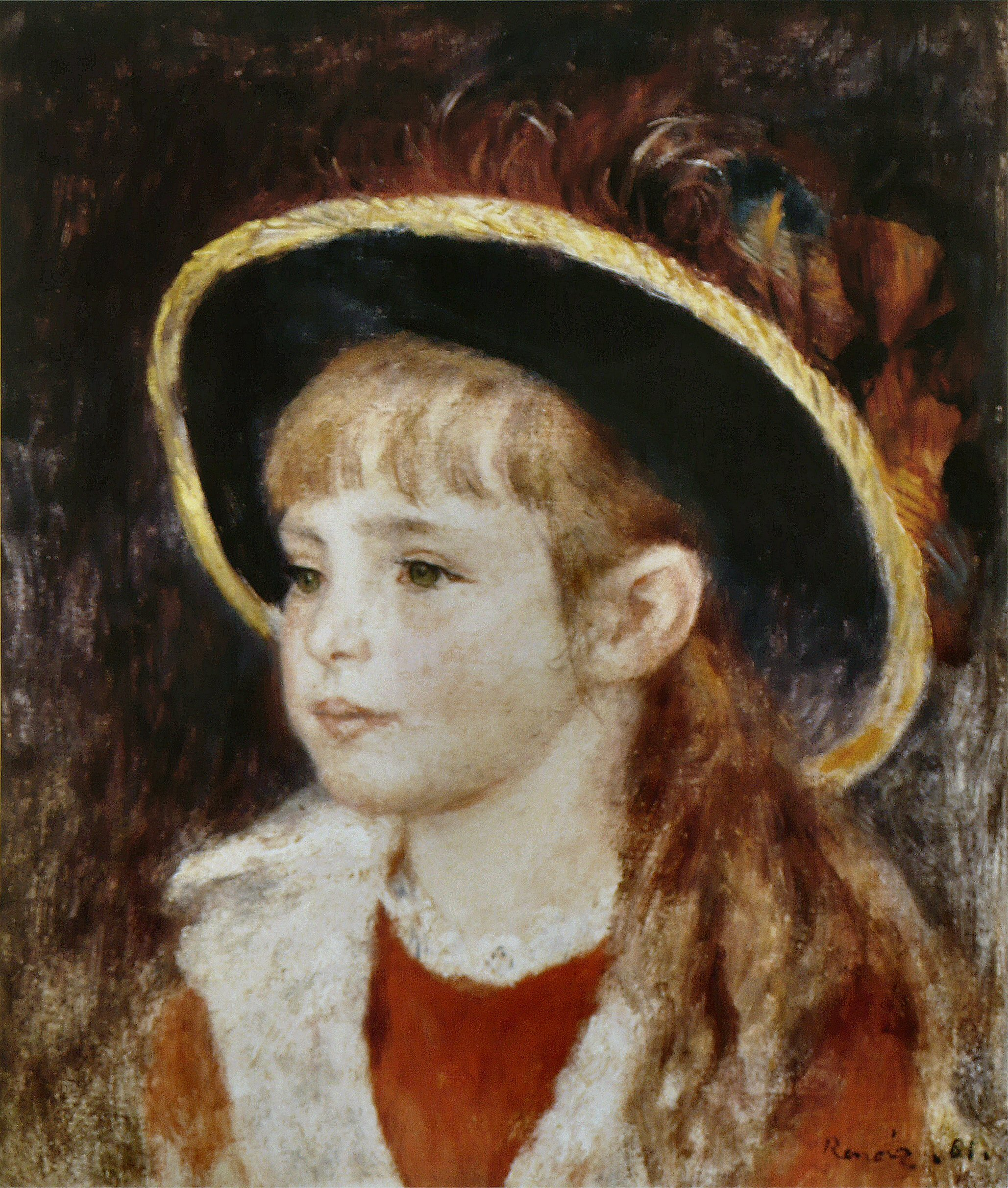
Henriot's daughter (Jeanne Angèle Grossin)
Fillette au chapeau bleu
English: Little girl in blue hat
(1881)

== See also ==
- Impressionism
- Theatre of France

== Bibliography ==
- Bailey, Colin B. (1997). Renoir's Portraits: Impressions of an Age. Yale University Press. National Gallery of Canada. ISBN 0888846681. OCLC 37208933.
