= Nature morte au poron =

1948 painting by Pablo Picasso

- Still life with porrón (English)
- Artist: Pablo Picasso
- Year: 1948
- Medium: Oil on canvas
- Dimensions: 50.3 cm × 61 cm (19.8 in × 24 in)
- Location: Welsh National Museum of Art, Cardiff, Wales

Nature morte au poron (English: Still life with porrón) is a 1948 oil-on-canvas painting by Pablo Picasso. It is a still-life painting in a cubist style. Picasso painted three versions of the work on 26 December 1948; one is in the collection of the Welsh National Museum of Art, Cardiff, Wales. The painting measures 50.3 × 61 cm.

== Background ==
Still life was a recurring theme for Picasso during the 1940s. He repeatedly returned to this genre during the Second World War and also during a later period when he was living in Vallauris with his partner Françoise Gilot. Picasso created few oil paintings during 1948, instead concentrating on his ceramics at the Madoura Pottery in Vallauris on the French Cote d'Azur. His preferred subjects during this period were Françoise Gilot, their son, Claude and still life.

== Description ==
Nature morte au poron is an oil-on-canvas still-life painting measuring 50.3 x 61 cm. It is one of three paintings that Picasso produced the day after Christmas day in 1948. It depicts a table, upon which has been placed a porrón (a traditional Spanish drinking vessel), a lemon and a lobster. The painting was created in a cubist style, with flat angular planes and bright colours. The hexagonal tiles on the floor depicted in the painting have been identified as those in Picasso's studio on the Rue des Grands-Augustins in Paris's Saint-Germain-des-Prés quarter. Picasso was greatly influenced by the work of Paul Cézanne, which is evident in the way that the table is tilted towards the viewer in this painting.

Many elements of Picasso's artwork were autobiographical, which is evident in the subject matter of this painting. The work therefore offers a glimpse into the food prepared in Picasso's kitchen. Marie-Laure Bernadac noted the autobiographical nature of the work, stating, "Indeed under each pot, bowl of fruit, or guitar, there lurks a story, a person, or an anecdote that is part of the painter's life. Because of the autobiographical nature of his art, and because he assigned an equal value to the animal, mineral, plant, and human realms, he painted whatever was around him. When he was at the seashore, he painted fish and crustaceans".

== Provenance ==
The painting was bought by the National Museum Wales for £1.435 million in 2009 to celebrate the museum's centenary; £100,000 of which came from the Art Fund, with the remainder from the Derek Williams Trust. It had initially been sold by the Parisian gallery Galerie Louise Leiris in 1949. This was the first oil painting by Picasso to enter a Welsh public collection.

== Significance and legacy ==
The graphic nature and linear emphasis in Picasso's still life painting would eventually provide inspiration for other artists. Sotheby's commented on the significance of this painting, stating, "Paring down the representation of each object to just a few bold, black and white lines, he is able to convey both movement and stasis, light and shadow in a way that would eventually inspire Arshile Gorky and the Abstract Expressionists in the United States".

== See also ==
- Le pigeon aux petit pois
- Violon et raisins
- Bottle, glass, fork
- 1948 in art
