= La Parisienne (Renoir) =

1874 painting by Pierre-Auguste Renoir

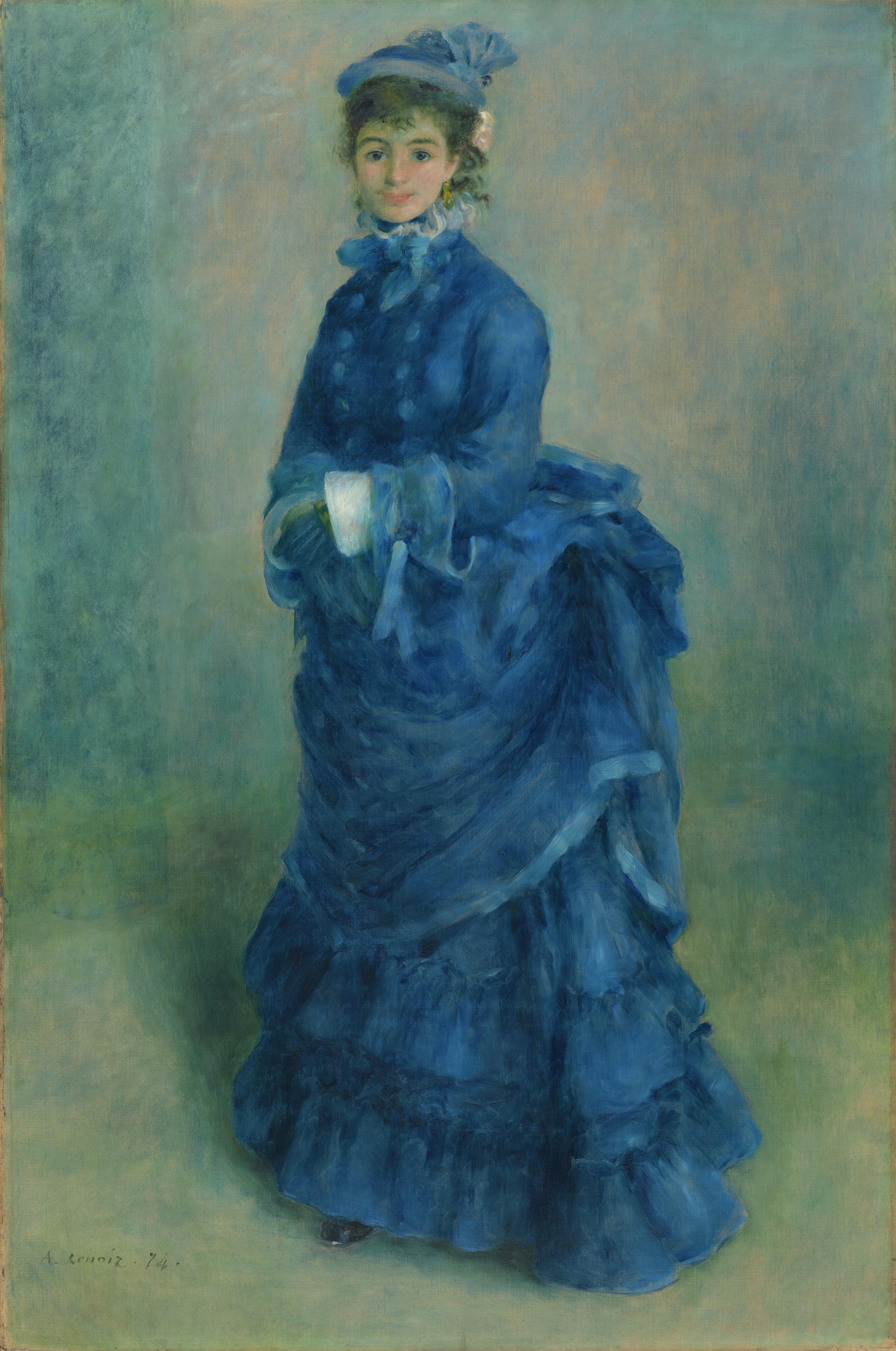
- Artist: Pierre-Auguste Renoir
- Year: 1874
- Medium: Oil on canvas
- Dimensions: 163.5 cm × 108.5 cm (64.4 in × 42.7 in)
- Location: National Museum Cardiff

La Parisienne (English: The Parisian) is an oil painting by the French artist Pierre-Auguste Renoir, completed in 1874 and now displayed at the National Museum Cardiff. The work, which was one of seven presented by Renoir at the First Impressionist Exhibition in 1874, is often referred to as The Blue Lady (French: La Dame en Bleu) and is one of the centrepieces of the National Museum's art collection.

== Style ==
La Parisienne is a painting in oils on canvas completed in 1874, signed and dated by the artist. It shows a young woman in a long layered dress of a striking deep blue, her face turned to the viewer as she puts on her gloves. Originally the painting had as its background a doorway in the upper left and a curtain at the upper right, but these were subsequently painted out by Renoir before its first exhibit. This leaves the central figure almost floating in a neutral space, uncluttered by detail.

The non-descript background of blue, mauve and yellow-grey adds significantly to the final appearance of the work. The paint on the background is far thinner and more loosely brushed, than the more detailed and layered central figure. The work of the hair against the hat, the earrings and above the earrings as well as the upper eyelashes appear to have been added after the painting had received its varnish layer.

== Critical response ==
When first exhibited in 1874, under the title La Parisienne, the painting, like most of the other works on display that day, received mixed reviews; though most critics mentioned it in passing. French critic Ernest Chesneau described it as a 'failure'. Jean Prouvaire of Le Rappel expressed mixed sentiments about the painting:

"The toe of her ankle boot is almost invisible, and peeps out like a little black mouse. Her hat is tilted over one ear and is daringly coquettish. Her dress does not reveal enough of her body. There is nothing more annoying than locked doors. Is the painting a portrait? It is to be feared so. The smile is false, and the face is a strong mixture of the old and the childish. But there is still something naïve about her. One gets the impression that this little lady is trying hard to look chaste. The dress which is extremely well painted, is a heavenly blue."

In 1898, while the painting was in the collection of Henri Rouart, artist Paul Signac described the La Parisienne as:

"a large painting of a woman in blue painted by Renoir in 1874. The dress is blue, a pure intense blue. The contrast makes the woman's skin look yellowish and reflection makes it look green. The interaction between the colours is captured admirably. It is simple, fresh and beautiful. It was painted twenty years ago, but you would think it had come straight from the studio."

Since becoming part of the collection of the National Museum of Wales in 1952, La Parisienne has become an important part of the museum's collection. Ann Sumner in her 2005 publication, Colour and Light describes it as "the most famous painting in the National Museum", while the Cardiff museum states that, "the painting is regarded as one of their most popular exhibits".

== History ==
La Parisienne was completed in 1874 and was first displayed, along with five other oil paintings and a pastel from Renoir, at the studio of Nadar in the April of that year at the First Impressionist Exhibition. Also featured at the studio were works by Claude Monet, Paul Cézanne, Camille Pissarro, Alfred Sisley and other leading lights of the embryonic Impressionism art movement.

The model for the painting was French actress Henriette Henriot (1857–1944), who at the time of the sitting was sixteen years old. Henriot was an unknown in 1874, though she would later become well known appearing at the Théâtre de l'Odéon and starred in productions for André Antoine's Théâtre Libre. Henriot would sit for at least eleven other paintings for Renoir, including La Source (1875) and The Page (1876).

La Parisienne was bought in the year of its first exhibit in 1874. Art collector and fellow Impressionist artist Henri Rouart paid Renoir 1,500 francs for the painting, hanging it at his home at the Rue de Lisbonne in Paris. Rouart loaned the painting to a Parisian exhibition in 1892, where it was displayed under the title La Dame en Bleu. When Rouart died in early 1912 his collection was broken up and auctioned. La Parisienne was sold in Paris in December 1912 where it was jointly purchased by Paul Durand-Ruel and the American art dealership Knoedler. Durand-Ruel later sold his share of the painting to Knoedler and the work was displayed at the National Portrait Society exhibition at Grosvenor Square in London in 1913. It was purchased for £5,000 from the exhibition in March by Welsh art collector Gwendoline Davies where it was transferred to the Holburne of Menstrie Museum in Bath. The painting was bequeathed to the National Museum Wales in 1952 where it has remained to date. It is popularly known in Wales as The Blue Lady. It is on display in gallery 16 of the National Museum, Cardiff.

== See also ==
- List of paintings by Pierre-Auguste Renoir

== Bibliography ==
- Sumner, Ann (2005). Colour and Light: Fifty Impressionist and Post-Impressionist Works at the National Museum of Wales. Cardiff: National Museum of Wales. ISBN 0-7200-0551-5.
