= Derek Williams (art collector) =

Welsh art collector (1929–1984)

Derek Mathias Tudor Williams (1929–1984) was a Welsh collector of modern art who left his collection to the National Museums and Galleries of Wales; it is displayed at National Museum Cardiff.

Williams was from the Llandaff district of Cardiff, and was educated at Radley College. Williams spent his professional life as a chartered surveyor in his family's business. In the 1960s Williams started purchasing art from Cardiff's Howard Roberts Gallery, initially focusing on the works of Ceri Richards and John Piper. The museum has described Williams as the "greatest benefactor" to the museum "since Gwendoline and Margaret Davies." Williams died in 1984 and left his artworks and fortune to a trust, the Derek Williams Trust. The trust loans artworks to the National Museum Wales and helps the museum purchase new pieces in partnership with the museum. In 2004 the National Museum Wales commissioned a bust of Williams by the Welsh sculptor Luke Shepherd to mark the twentieth anniversary of Williams's death.
