= National Museum Cardiff =

Museum and art gallery in Cardiff, Wales

- Amgueddfa Genedlaethol Caerdydd
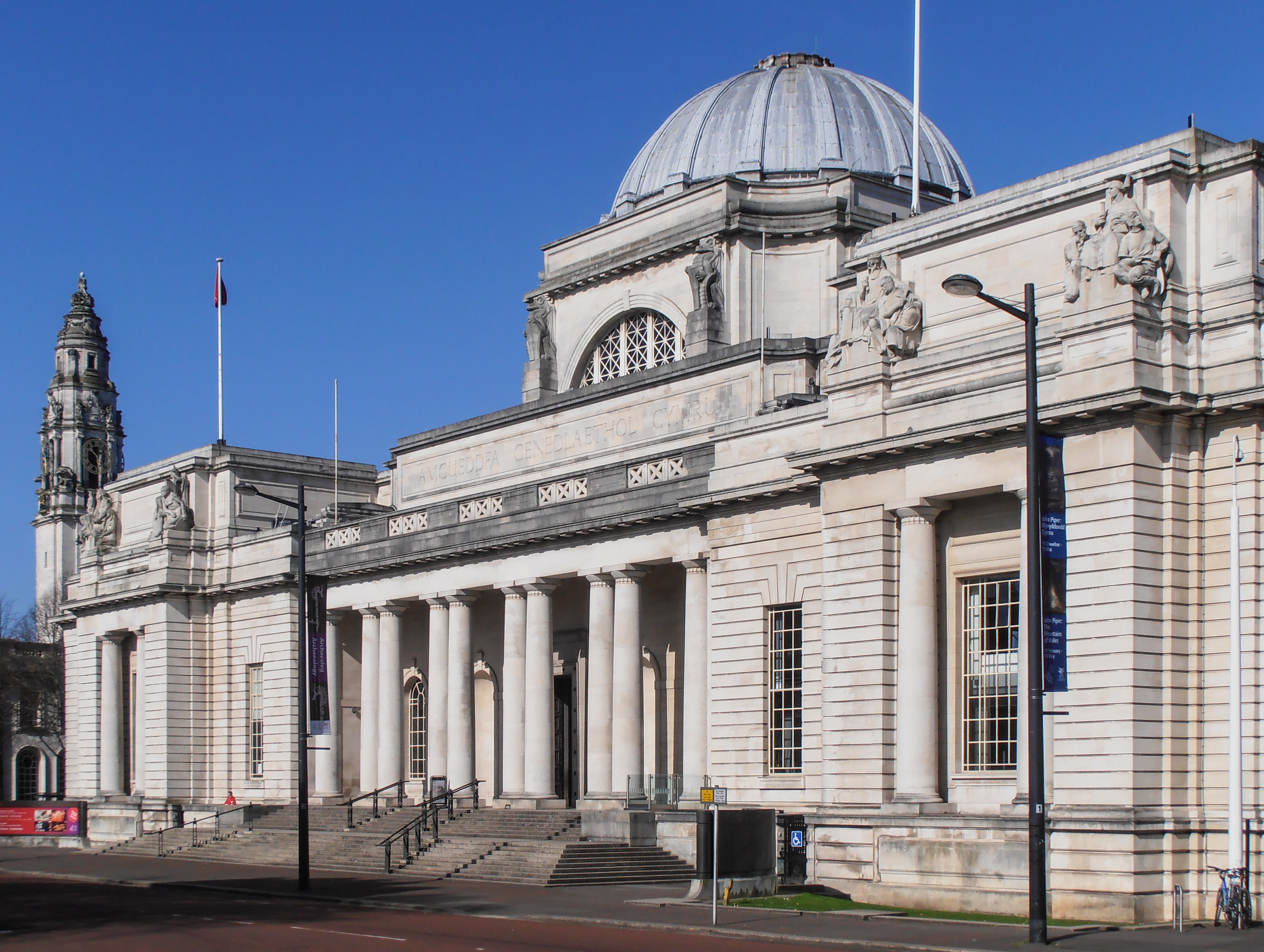
- Façade of the National Museum Cardiff

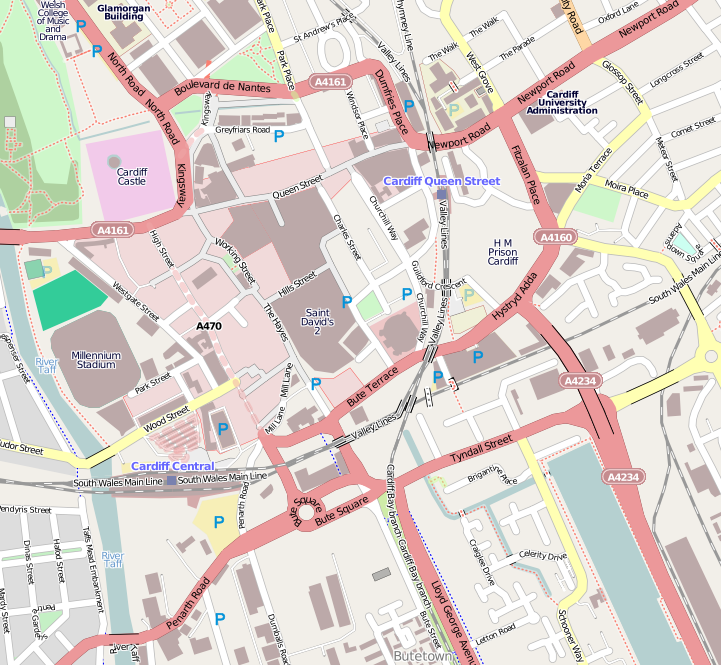
- Location in central Cardiff
- Established: 1912; 114 years ago
- Location: Cathays Park, Cardiff CF10 3NP, Wales
- Coordinates: 51.4858°N 3.1773°W
- Visitors: 472,544 (2015)
- Public transit access: Cathays; Cardiff Bus 27
- Website: museum.wales/cardiff/

National Museum Cardiff (Welsh: Amgueddfa Genedlaethol Caerdydd), formerly known as the National Museum of Wales, is a museum and art gallery in Cardiff, Wales. The museum is part of the wider network of Amgueddfa Cymru – Museum Wales. Entry is kept free by a grant from the Welsh Government.

== History ==
The National Museum of Wales was founded in 1905, with its royal charter granted in 1907. Part of the bid for Cardiff to obtain the National Museum for Wales included the gift of the Cardiff Museum Collection, then known as "Welsh Museum of Natural History, Archaeology and Art," which was formally handed over in 1912. The Cardiff Museum was sharing the building of Cardiff Library, and was a sub-department of the library until 1893. Construction of a new building in the civic complex of Cathays Park began in 1912, but owing to the First World War it did not open to the public until 1922, with the official opening taking place in 1927. The architects were Arnold Dunbar Smith and Cecil Brewer, although the building as it now stands is a heavily truncated version of their design.

The sculpture scheme for the building was devised by Sir W. Goscombe John and consisted of the groups Prehistoric Period and Classic Period by Gilbert Bayes as well as Learning, Mining, and Shipping by Thomas J Clapperton, Art by Bertram Pegram, Medieval Period by Richard Garbe, Music by David Evans, and others. D. Arthur Thomas was commissioned to produce a model for the dragons, and A. Bertram Pegram to produce a model for the lions that were placed around the base of the dome.

== Present ==
The museum has collections of botany, fine and applied art, geology, and zoology. Archaeology has been moved to the St Fagans National Museum of History.

In 2011, with funding from the Clore Duffield Foundation, the former Glanely Gallery was transformed into the Clore Discovery Centre, which offers hands-on exploration of the museum's 7.5 million items that are normally in storage, including insects, fossils and Bronze Age weapons. School groups, formal and informal groups can also be accommodated but should book in advance.

Between 2022-2024 internal management disputes between the-then president of the museum, Roger Lewis, who had formerly run the Welsh Rugby Union, and the-then director-general, David Anderson, saw both leave the museum. The handling of the dispute, which concluded with a settlement to Mr Anderson of £325,000, with legal bills bringing the total cost to the Senedd of over £600,000, drew criticism from Audit Wales.

=== Black Lives Matter movement ===
Following the removal of the Statue of Edward Colston in Bristol on 6 June 2020, Wales Online reported on a similar campaign to remove monuments to Lieutenant-General Sir Thomas Picton, a Welsh soldier, in Carmarthen and Cardiff. While Picton was revered as a hero in the 19th century after dying at the Battle of Waterloo, the most senior British Army officer to lose his life, his previous record as governor of Trinidad was controversial even at the time, and saw him convicted of widespread abuse of the island's population, including the use of torture. (Note: Although Picton subsequently had the conviction reversed on a technicality, his brutality was well-known; the Duke of Wellington described him as "a rough foul-mouthed devil as ever lived".) In November 2021, the museum removed a 19th-century portrait of Sir Thomas by Sir Martin Archer Shee and replaced it with a painting of a Welsh gardener by Albert Houthuesen. The museum commissioned artists to re-examine the legacy of Sir Thomas.

=== Closure ===
The museum has experienced severe funding difficulties for most of the 2020s and in 2024 its chief executive expressed concern that it may be forced to close as a result of a lack of funding for maintenance repairs necessary to keep the building safe for visitors and staff. Lesley Griffiths, then Cabinet Secretary for Culture and Social Justice (Wales), refuted this claim, giving an assurance that the "National Museum is not closing". In early February 2025 the museum announced a "temporary closure" due to "building maintenance and health and safety concerns". The museum reopened on 7 February 2025, but the closure prompted media discussion regarding the levels of Senedd funding for cultural and historic buildings and events.

== Art collection ==
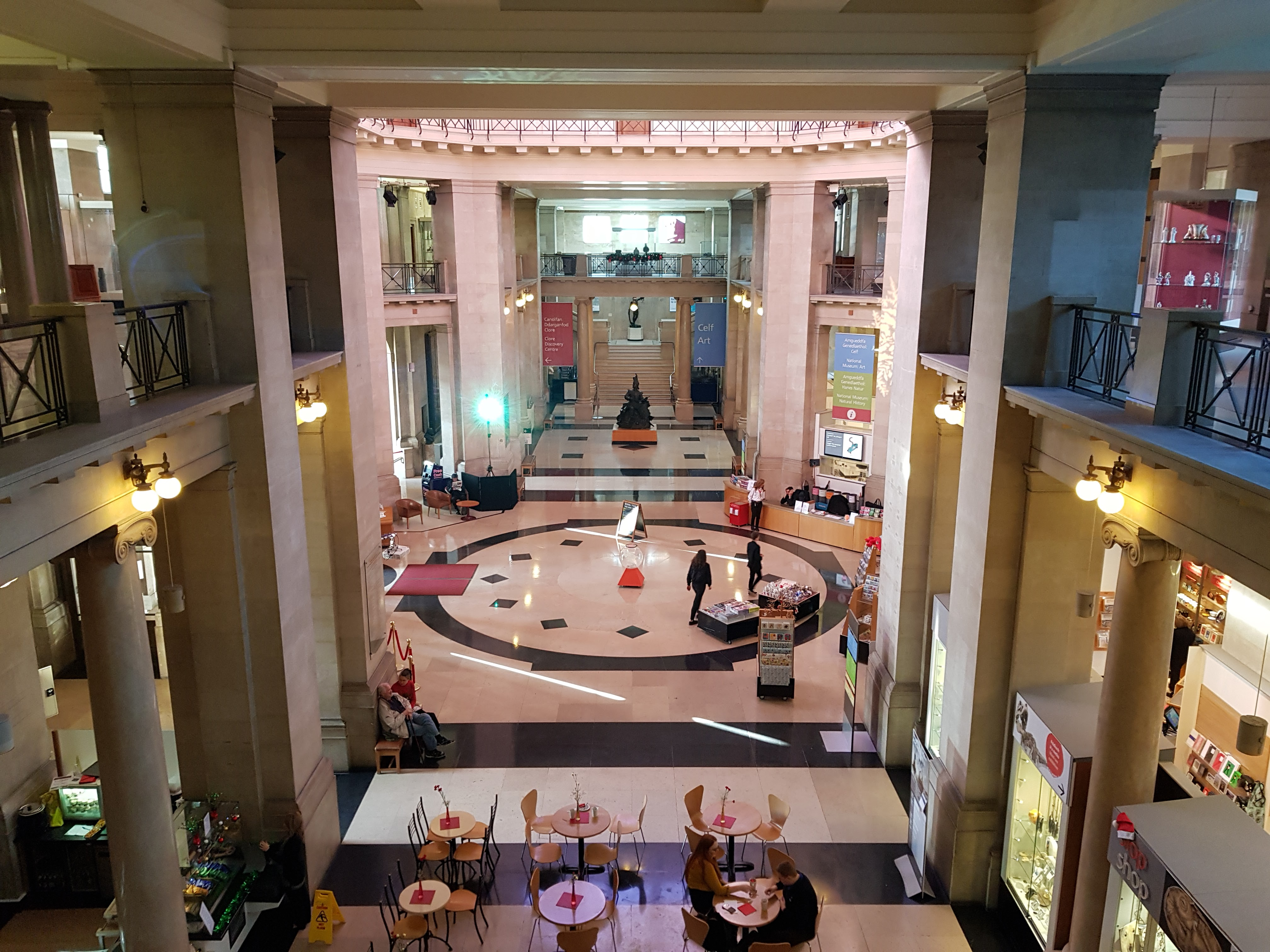
The main hall of the Museum

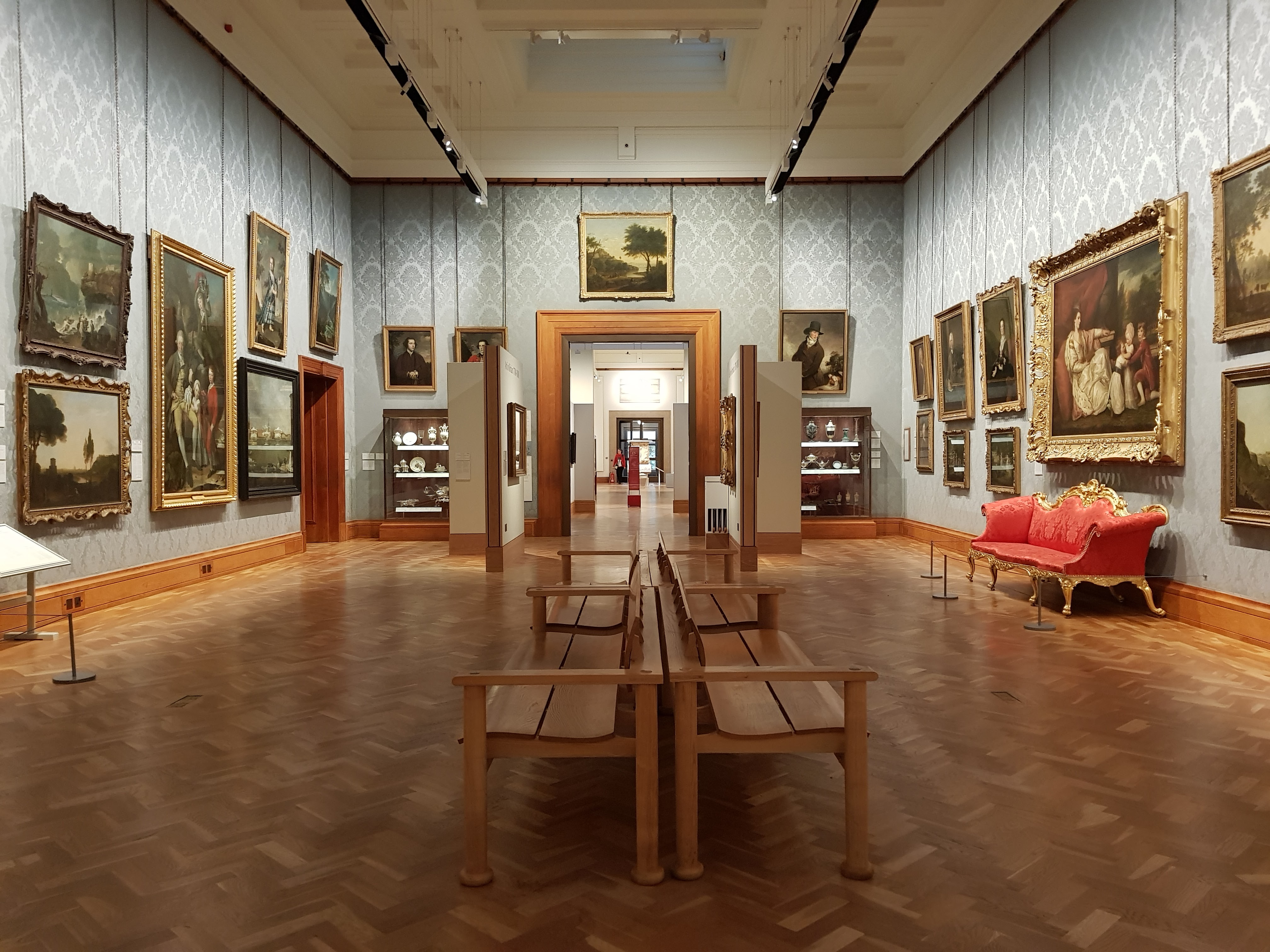
Gallery 4 (Art in 18th-century Britain)

The collection of Old Master paintings at National Museum Cardiff includes, among other notable works, The Virgin and Child Between Saint Helena and Saint Francis by Amico Aspertini, The Poulterer's Shop by Frans Snyders, and A Calm by Jan van de Cappelle. Since 2016, the museum has had Rembrandt's 1657 Portrait of Catharina Hooghsaet on permanent display. In 2019, a painting depicting the Madonna and Child with a Pomegranate, which was thought to be a late copy by a lesser artist of a lost work by Sandro Botticelli, featured on the television programme Britain's Lost Masterpieces where, after conservation treatment by Simon Gillespie and research by Bendor Grosvenor, it was confirmed to be from the studio of Botticelli, with parts by the master himself.

A collection of landscape paintings in the classical tradition includes works by Claude, Gaspard Dughet, Salvator Rosa and two works by Nicolas Poussin: The Funeral of Phocion (1648) and The Finding of Moses (the latter owned jointly by the Museum and the National Gallery, London). These works prefigure the career of the Welsh-born Richard Wilson, called "the father of British landscape painting". In 1979 four cartoons for tapestries illustrating scenes from the Aeneid were bought as works by Peter Paul Rubens, but the attribution is now disputed.

There is a gallery devoted to British patronage of the 18th century, in particular that of Sir Watkin Williams-Wynn. Included is a portrait of Williams-Wynn in Rome with fellow Tourists by Pompeo Batoni, one of his second wife by Sir Joshua Reynolds and his chamber organ designed by Robert Adam. Other paintings of note from this period is a portrait of Viscountess Elizabeth Bulkeley of Beaumaris as the mythological character Hebe, by the "sublime and terrible" George Romney, and Johann Zoffany's group portrait of Henry Knight, a Glamorgan landowner, with his children.

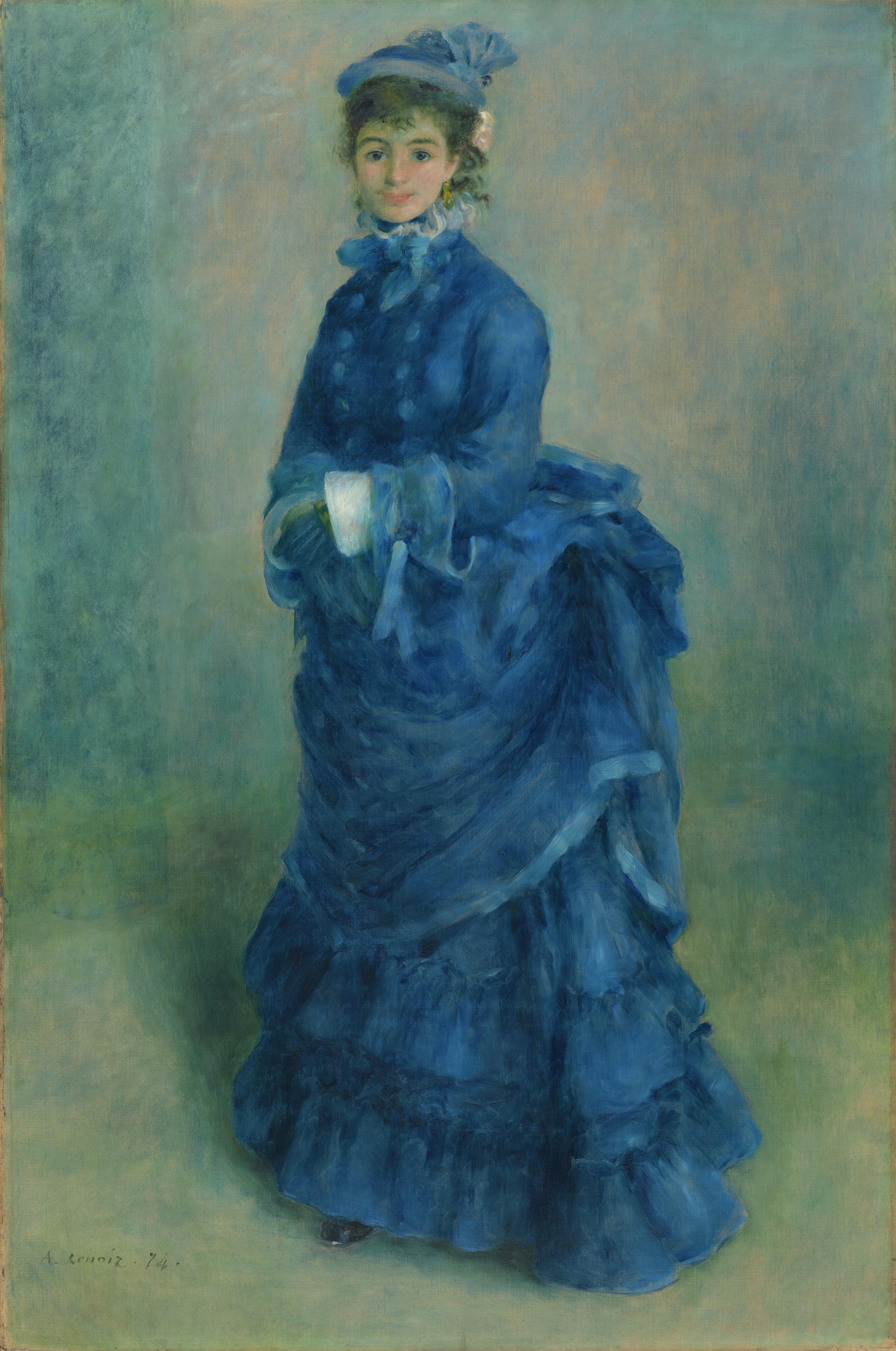
La Parisienne by Pierre-Auguste Renoir, 1874, of the model Henriette Henriot, is one of the National Museum's most popular works

The collection of French art assembled by Margaret and Gwendoline Davies, granddaughters of the wealthy industrialist David Davies, bequeathed to the National Museum in the 1950s and 1960s, is of international standing. It includes the largest group of paintings by Honoré Daumier in the world and the most important by Jean-François Millet in Britain. Works by Claude Monet include Venetian scenes such as San Giorgio Maggiore at Dusk and examples from his Rouen Cathedral and Water Lilies series. Post-Impressionism is represented by Van Gogh's late work Rain at Auvers, and by Paul Cézanne's The François Zola Dam, the first painting by the artist to be displayed in a British public collection. The two most famous works in the Davies sisters' collection are La Parisienne by Pierre-Auguste Renoir (1874), exhibited in the First Impressionist Exhibition, and a version of Rodin's Kiss cast in bronze.

The art gallery has works by all of the notable Welsh artists, including landscapes by Richard Wilson and the pioneering Thomas Jones. There is a considerable body of work by John Gibson, Queen Victoria's favourite sculptor, and major paintings by Augustus John and his sister Gwen John, including the former's famous image of Dylan Thomas. Ceri Richards is well represented. The artistic output of David Jones is well represented, but seldom on display owing to the fragile nature of his works on paper. Wales's most prominent contemporary painter, Sir Kyffin Williams (1918–2006), also features in the collection.

The collection of 20th-century art includes works by the sculptors Jacob Epstein, Herbert Ward and Eric Gill and painters including Stanley Spencer, the British Impressionist Wynford Dewhurst, L. S. Lowry, and Oskar Kokoschka. Works by contemporary artists are on rotational display, including those by Francis Bacon, Frank Auerbach and Rachel Whiteread. Pablo Picasso's Nature morte au poron was acquired in 2009.

== Gallery ==
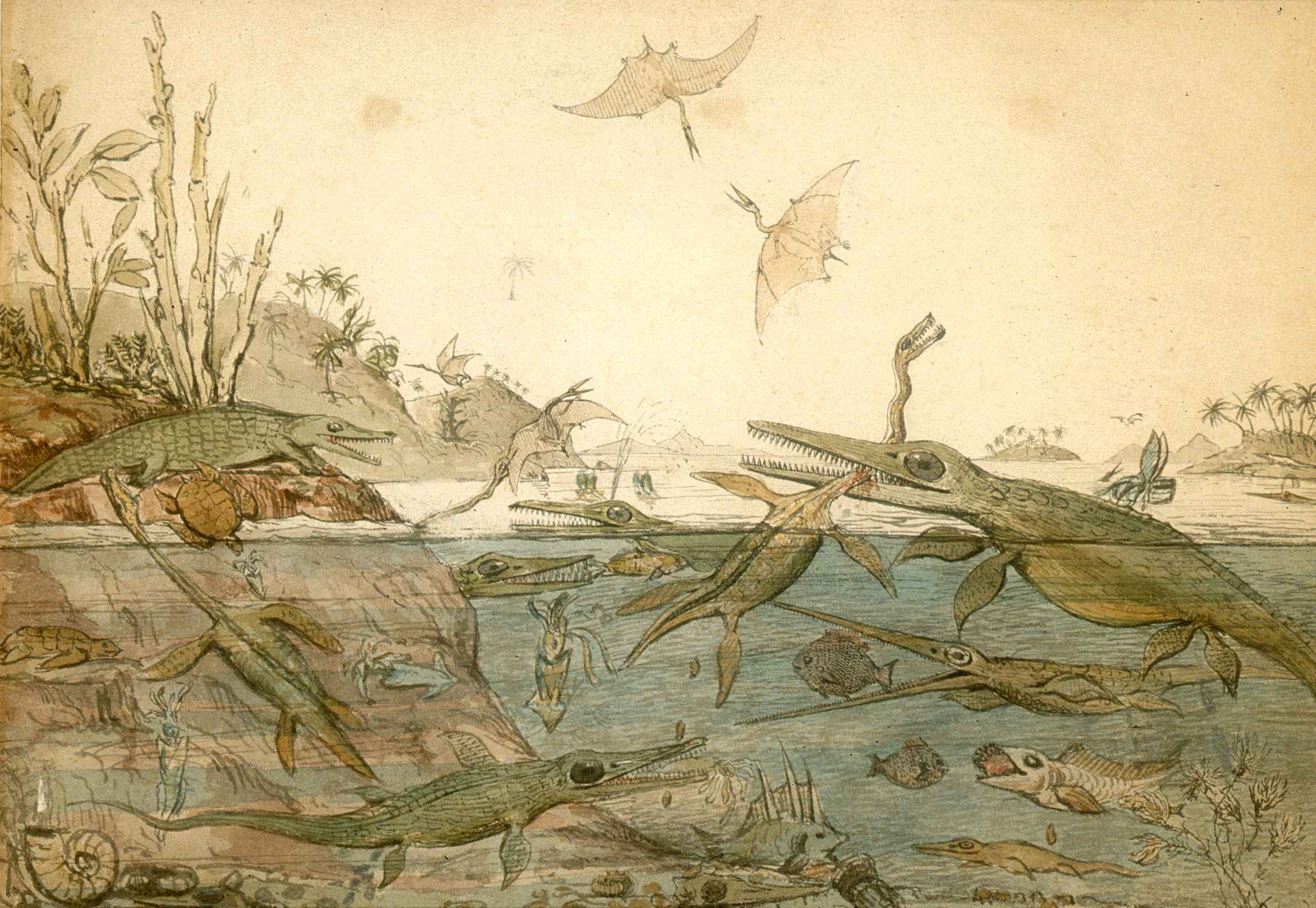
Duria Antiquior, Henry De la Beche, 1830

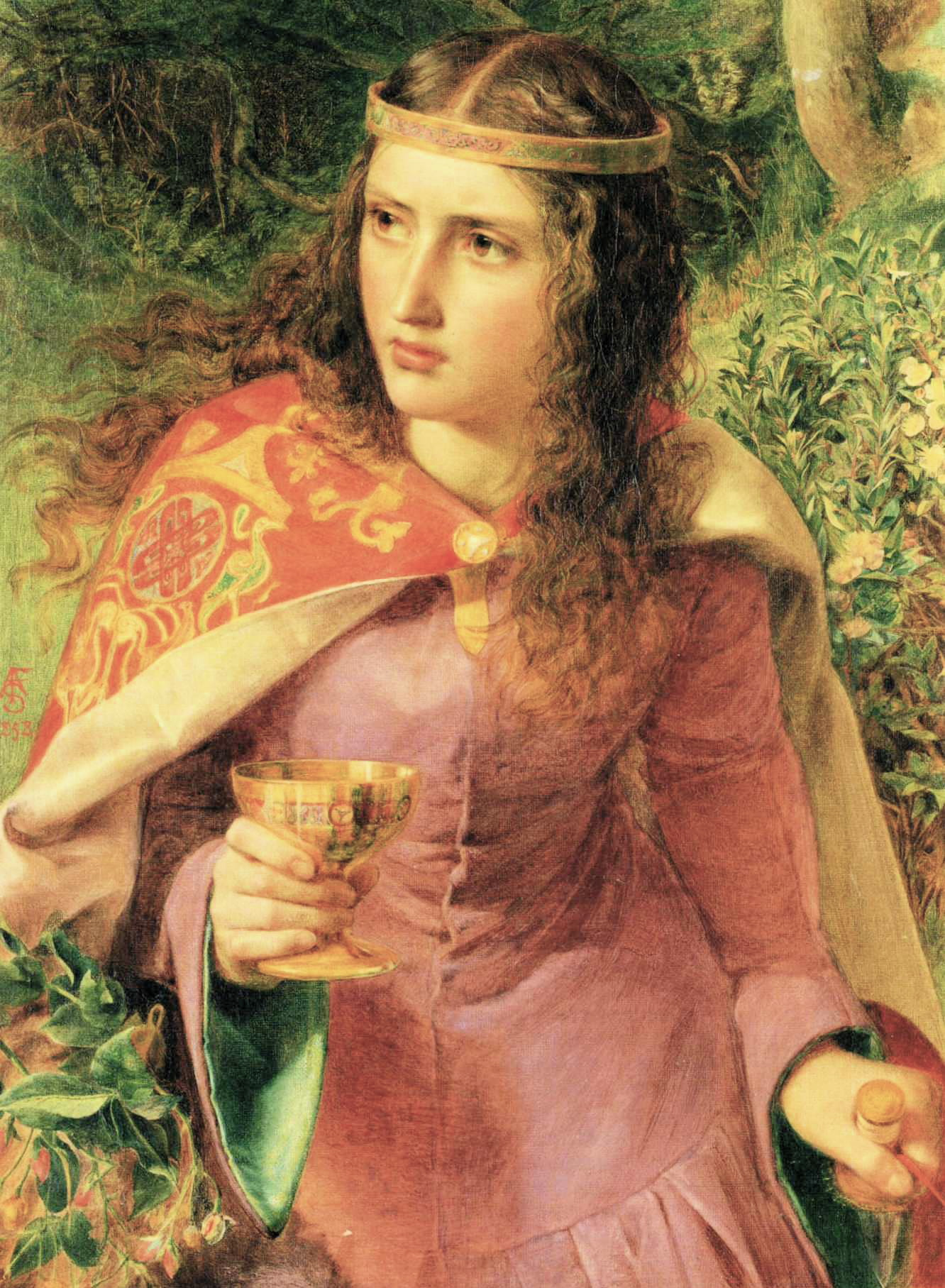
Queen Eleanor, Frederick Sandys, 1858

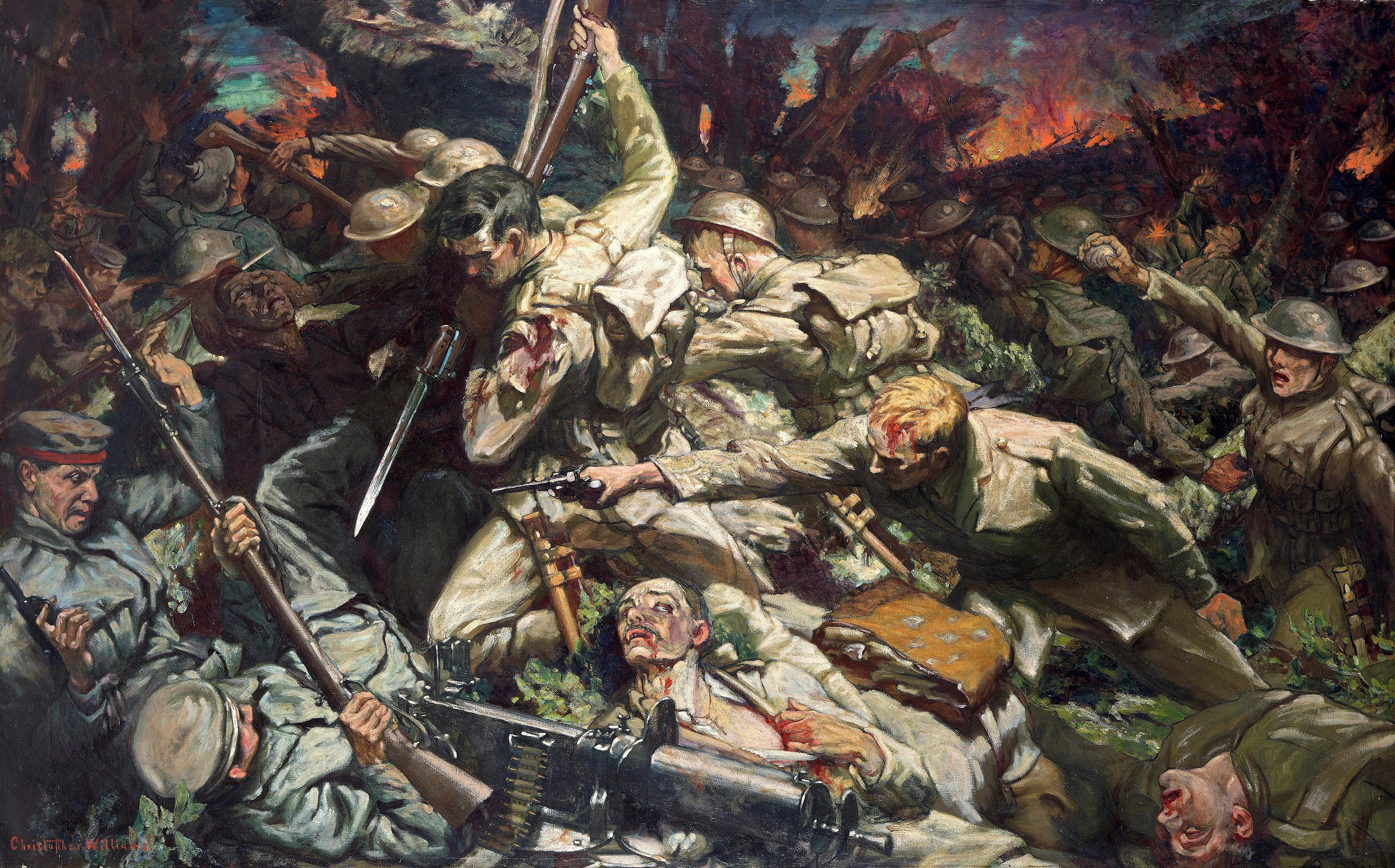
The Welsh at Mametz Wood, Christopher Williams, c. 1917

The Empty Mask, René Magritte, 1928

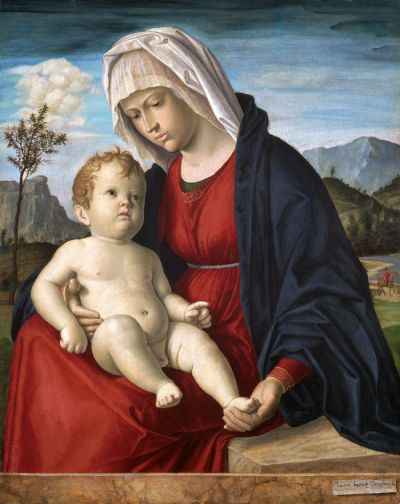
Madonna and Child,Giovanni Battista Cima da Conegliano, c. 1500

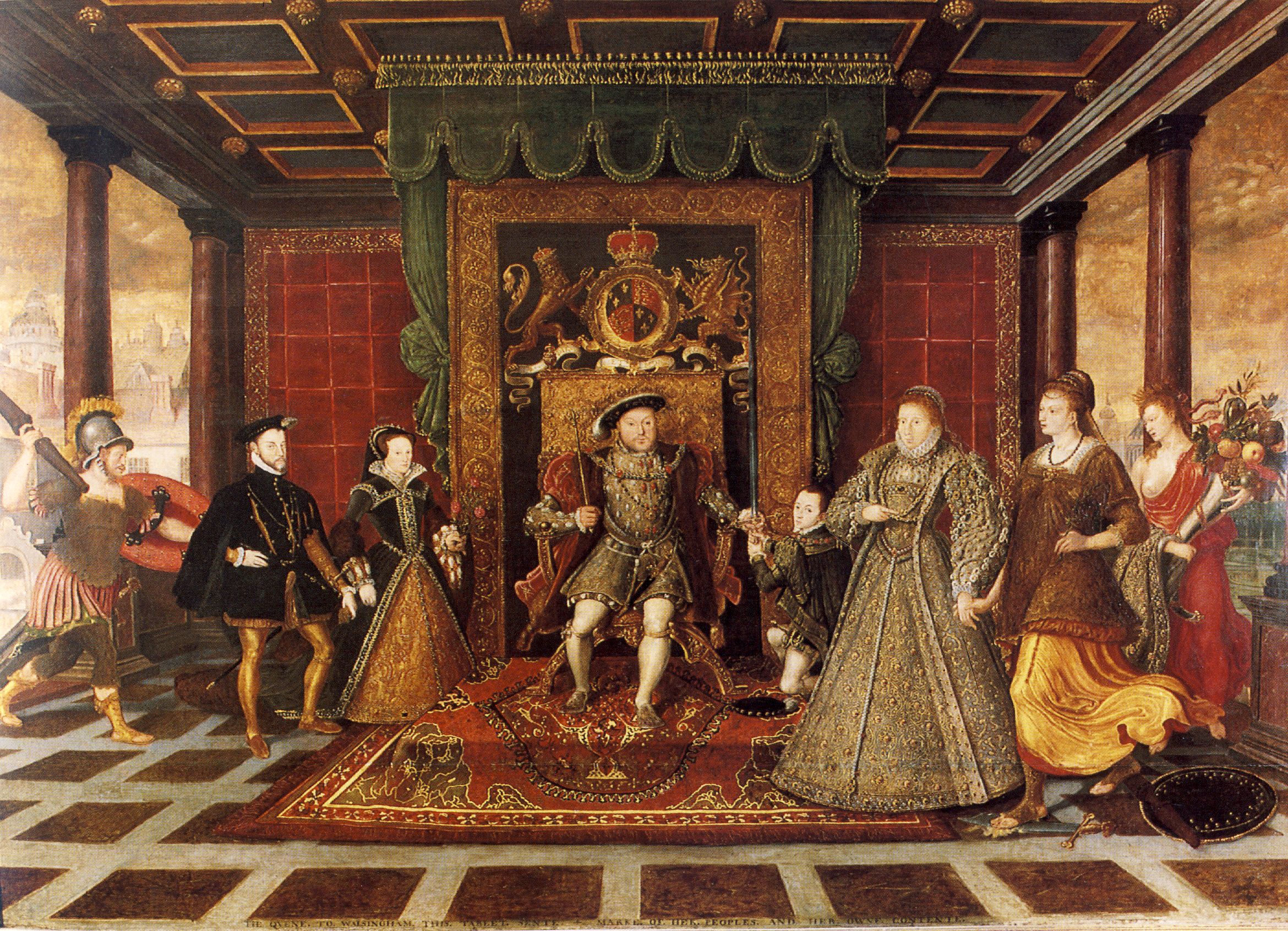
The Family of Henry VIII: An Allegory of the Tudor Succession, Lucas de Heere, 1572

== See also ==
- Morgan-Botti lecture
- List of national galleries
