= Mother and Children =

Painting by Pierre-Auguste Renoir

- La Promenade (French)
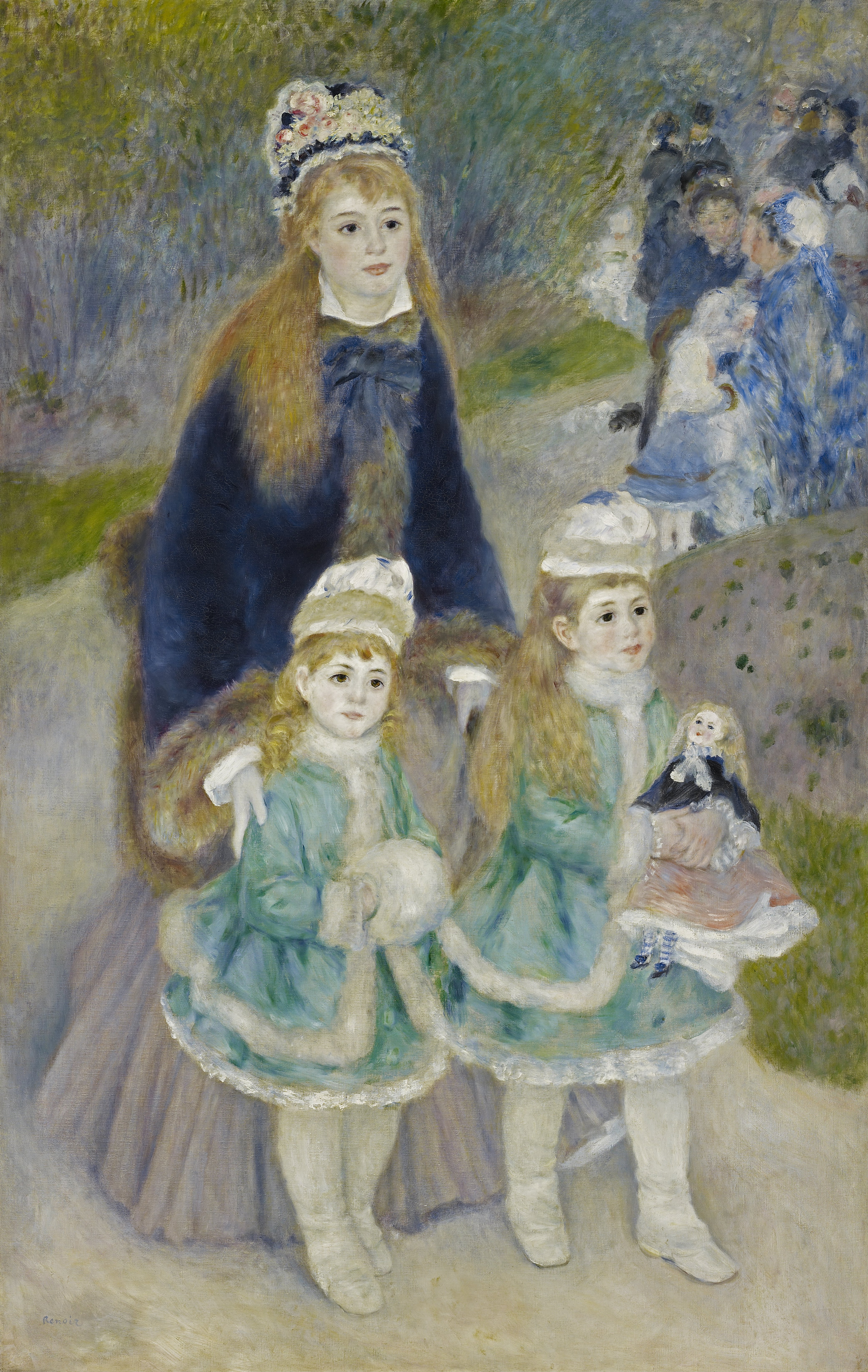
- Artist: Pierre-Auguste Renoir
- Year: 1876
- Subject: A mother and her two girls
- Dimensions: 170.2 cm × 108.3 cm (67.0 in × 42.6 in)
- Location: Frick Collection; New York City
- Website: www.frick.org/interact/pierre-auguste-renoir-mother-and-children-la-promenade

External videos
- Renoir, La Promenade on YouTube, (1:49) Frick Collection

Mother and Children (also known as La Promenade) is an Impressionist painting by Pierre-Auguste Renoir that is housed in the Frick Collection. Although the painting is most commonly known as Mother and Children, Renoir presented it with the title La Promenade in 1876. The painting is displayed in an alcove under a set of stairs at the Frick.

== See also ==
- List of paintings by Pierre-Auguste Renoir
- Frick Collection Catalogue Entry

== Bibliography ==
- House, John (1997). Pierre-Auguste Renoir: La Promenade. Getty Publications. ISBN 978-0-89236-365-0.
- Leapman, Michael (2000). The Companion Guide to New York. Companion Guides. ISBN 978-1-900639-32-3.
