= 1912 in France =

- Decades: 1890s; 1900s; 1910s; 1920s; 1930s
- See also: History of France; Timeline of French history; List of years in France

Events from the year 1912 in France.

== Incumbents ==
- President: Armand Fallières
- President of the Council of Ministers: Joseph Caillaux (until 21 January), Raymond Poincaré (starting 21 January)

== Events ==
- 13 January – Raymond Poincaré forms a coalition government, beginning his first term of office as Prime Minister on 21 January.
- 30 March – Treaty of Fez, Sultan Abdelhafid gives up the sovereignty of Morocco, making it a protectorate of France.
- 10 April – RMS Titanic embarks passengers from tenders at Cherbourg Harbour for the only time.

== Arts and literature ==
- Pierre Bonnard - La Femme au chat
- Georges Braque - Fruit Dish and Glass
- Robert Delaunay - Fenêtres ouvertes simultanément Ière partie 3e motif
- Marcel Duchamp - Nu descendant un escalier n° 2
- Albert Gleizes
  - Les Baigneuses
  - Le Dépiquage des Moissons
  - L'Homme au balcon
  - Les ponts de Paris (Passy)
- Henri Matisse
  - La Conversation
  - Les Poissons rouges
  - La Petite Mulâtresse
  - Paysage marocain (Acanthes)
  - Le Rifain assis
  - Vue sur la baie de Tanger
  - La Fenêtre à Tanger
  - Zorah sur la terrasse
- Jean Metzinger
  - Au Vélodrome
  - L'Oiseau bleu
  - Danseuse au café
  - Man with a Pipe
  - Femme à l'Éventail
  - La Femme au Cheval
- Claude Monet - Saint-Georges Majeur au Crépuscule
- Francis Picabia
  - La Procession, Séville
  - La Source
- Pablo Picasso
  - Bouteille, Verre, et Fourchette
  - Violon et Raisins

== Film ==
- André Calmettes - Richard III
- Alice Guy-Blaché - L'Américanisé
- Georges Méliès - À la conquête du pôle
- Louis Mercanton & Henri Desfontaines - Les Amours de la reine Élisabeth

== Literature ==
- Anatole France - Les dieux ont soif
- Maurice Leblanc - The Crystal Stopper
- Louis Pergaud - La Guerre des boutons

== Music ==
- Claude Debussy - Khamma (piano score only)
- Paul Dukas - La Péri
- Reynaldo Hahn - Le Dieu bleu
- Jules Massenet - Roma
- Maurice Ravel - Daphnis et Chloé
- Camille Saint-Saëns - Triptyque, Op. 136
- Erik Satie
  - Véritables Préludes flasques (pour un chien)
  - Prélude de la porte héroïque du ciel

== Sport ==
- 26 June – 1912 French Grand Prix, won by Georges Boillot driving a Peugeot.
- 30 June–28 July – 10th Tour de France, won by Odiel Defraye.

== Births ==
=== January to March ===
- 6 January – Jacques Ellul, philosopher, sociologist, theologian (died 1994)
- 15 January – Michel Debré, politician and first Prime Minister of the Fifth Republic (died 1996)
- 18 January – David Rousset, writer and political activist (died 1997)
- 3 February – Jacques Soustelle, anthropologist (died 1990)
- 7 February – Alfred Desenclos, composer (died 1971)
- 7 February – Amédée Fournier, cyclist (died 1992)
- 11 February – Jacques Corrèze, businessman and politician (died 1991)
- 12 February – Pierre Jaminet, cyclist (died 1968)
- 20 February – Pierre Boulle, novelist (died 1994)
- 25 March – Jean Vilar, actor (died 1971)
- 28 March – Léon Damas, poet and politician (died 1978)

=== April to June ===
- 12 April – Georges Franju, filmmaker (died 1987)
- 14 April – Robert Doisneau, photographer (died 1994)
- 19 April – Raymond Pichard, Dominican priest and television presenter (died 1992)
- 21 April – Marcel Camus, film director (died 1982)
- 28 April – Odette Sansom, World War II heroine (died 1995)
- 16 May – Alfred Aston, international soccer player (died 2003)
- 23 May – Jean Françaix, composer, pianist, and orchestrator (died 1997)
- 29 May – Pierre-Paul Schweitzer, fourth managing director of the International Monetary Fund (died 1994)
- 30 May – Roger Courtois, international soccer player (died 1972)
- 8 June – Roger Michelot, boxer (died 1993)
- 15 June – Alix Combelle, swing jazz tenor saxophonist, clarinetist and bandleader (died 1978)
- 22 June – Raymonde Allain, model and actress (died 2008)
- 29 June
  - Lucie Aubrac, World War II Resistance fighter (died 2007)
  - Émile Peynaud, oenologist and researcher (died 2004)

=== July to December ===
- 13 July – Suzanne Haïk-Vantoura, organist, music teacher, composer and music theorist (died 2000)
- 18 July – Max Rousié, rugby league and rugby union footballer (died 1959)
- 20 July – Lucette Destouches, classical dancer (died 2019)
- 5 August
  - Jacques Delannoy, footballer (died 1958)
  - Abbé Pierre, priest and founder of Emmaus movement (died 2007)
- 26 August – Léo Marjane, born Thérèse Maria Léonie Gendebien, popular singer (died 2016)
- 8 September – Marie-Dominique Philippe, Dominican philosopher and theologian (died 2006)
- 14 September – Jean Lescure, poet (died 2005)
- 3 November – Marie-Claude Vaillant-Couturier, member of the French Resistance (died 1996)
- 13 November – Claude Pompidou, philanthropist, wife of President of France Georges Pompidou (died 2007)
- 21 November – Pierre Grimal, historian and classicist (died 1996)
- 23 November – Paul Rivière, Resistance fighter and politician (died 1998)
- 10 December – René Toribio, Guadeloupean politician (died 1990)

=== Full date unknown ===
- Gérard Albouy, milliner (died 1985)
- Paul Petard, botanist (died 1980)

== Deaths ==
- 16 January – Alfred Jules Émile Fouillée, philosopher (born 1838)
- 14 April – Henri Brisson, statesman and Prime minister of France (born 1835)
- 12 June – Frédéric Passy, economist, joint winner (with Henry Dunant) of first Nobel Peace Prize, 1901 (born 1822)
- 16 June – Henri Jean Baptiste Anatole Leroy-Beaulieu, publicist and historian (born 1842)
- 17 July – Henri Poincaré, mathematician, theoretical physicist and philosopher of science (born 1854)
- 12 September – Pierre-Hector Coullié, Archbishop of Lyon (born 1829)

=== Full date unknown ===
- Magloire-Désiré Barthet, Vicar Apostolic of Senegambia (born 1832)
- Félicien Henry Caignart de Saulcy, entomologist (born 1832)

== See also ==
- List of French films of 1912
