= Woman with a Cat =

Woman with a Cat may refer to the following paintings:

- Woman with a Cat (Renoir), 1875 painting by French artist Pierre-Auguste Renoir, National Gallery of Art, Washington, D.C.
- Woman with a Cat, 1893–1894 painting by American artist Cecilia Beaux, Musée d'Orsay, Paris
- Woman with Cat (van Dongen), 1908 painting by Dutch-French Fauve painter Kees van Dongen, Milwaukee Art Museum
- Woman with a Cat (Bonnard), 1912 painting by French artist Pierre Bonnard, Musée d'Orsay, Paris
- Woman with a Cat (Léger), two 1921 paintings by French artist Fernand Léger, Metropolitan Museum of Art and Hamburger Kunsthalle
