= Petard (disambiguation) =

A petard was a medieval small bomb used to blow up gates and walls when breaching fortifications; and a synonym for firecracker.

Petard may also refer to:

- HMS Petard, the name of two ships of the Royal Navy
- A petard §§ etymology and firecracker

== People with the surname ==
- Paul Petard (1912–1980), French botanist

== See also ==
- "Petarded", an episode of Family Guy
- "Hoist with his own petard", a phrase from the Shakespeare play Hamlet
  - H. Pétard, a pseudonym used by Ralph P. Boas Jr., based on the iconic phrase
