= Enigma-M4 =

Rotor key machine used in World War II

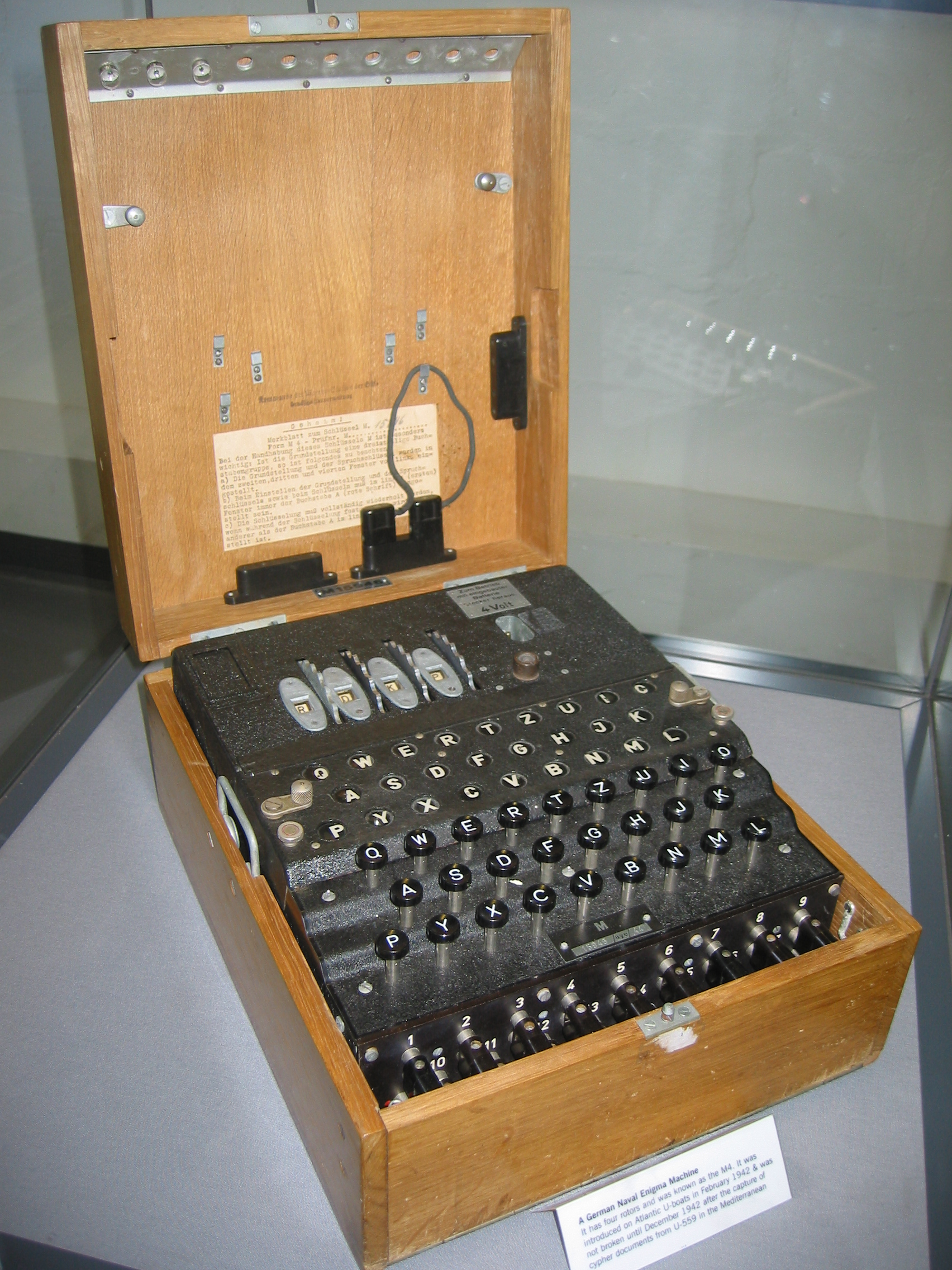
The Enigma-M4 key machine

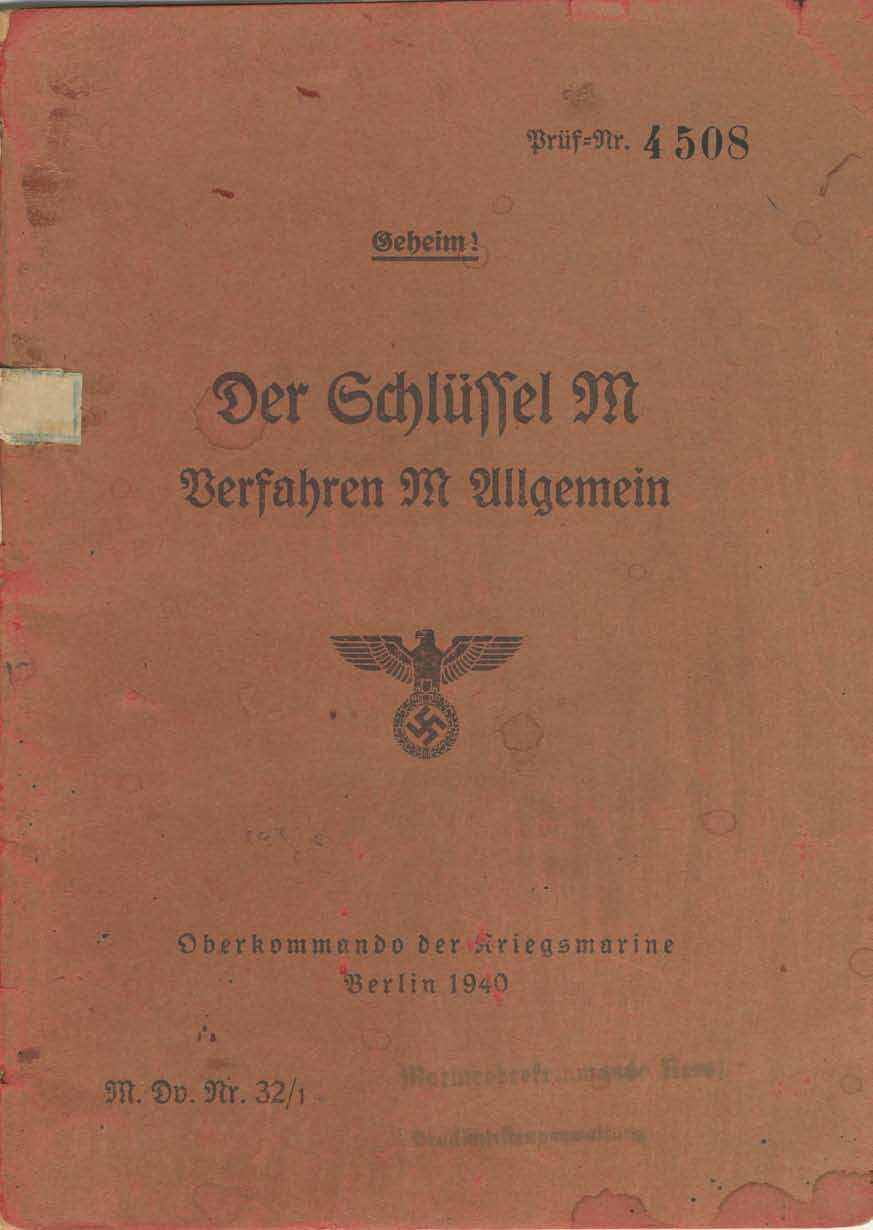
Key manual of the Kriegsmarine "Der Schlüssel M".

The Enigma-M4 (also called Schlüssel M, more precisely Schlüssel M Form M4) is a rotor key machine that was used for encrypted communication by the German Kriegsmarine during World War II from October 1941.

In contrast to the previously used Enigma-M3 and the Enigma I and the Enigma-G used by the German Secret services, the Enigma-M4 is characterized by four rollers (except for the entry roller and the reverse roller). This makes its encryption cryptographic significantly stronger than that of the other Enigma variants with only three rotors and therefore could not be broken by the Allies for a long time.

== Previous history ==
All parts of the German Wehrmacht used the rotor cipher machine to encrypt their secret messages. Enigma. However, different models were used. While the army and air force used the Enigma I almost exclusively, there were different model variants of the Enigma-M for the navy, which usually referred to it as the "Schlüssel M". The main difference was the use of more rollers than in the Enigma I, where three rollers could be selected from a range of five. This resulted in 5-4-3 = 60 possible roller positions of the Enigma I.

The Enigma-M1, on the other hand, had an assortment of six different rollers (marked with the Roman numerals I to VI), three of which were inserted into the machine. This increased the combinatorial complexity to 6-5-4 = 120 possible roller positions. In the Enigma-M2, the range of rollers had been increased by a further one, so that 7-6-5 = 210 roller layers were now possible. And with the Enigma-M3, which was used by the navy at the beginning of the war, there were eight rollers, three of which were used. This meant that the M3 had 8-7-6 = 336 possible roller positions. While the M1 to M3 models only ever used three rollers in the machine, the M4 had four rollers next to each other in the machine. This significantly increased the cryptographic security of the M4 compared to its predecessor models.

The operation was described in the naval service regulation M.Dv.Nr. 32/1 with the title "Der Schlüssel M - Verfahren M Allgemein". The key procedure used in the Enigma-M4 was precisely defined in this document.

A particularly important part of the key procedure, in addition to correct operation, was the agreement of a common cryptological key. As with all symmetric cryptosystems, the sender and receiver of an encrypted secret message not only had to have the same machine, but also had to set it identically to each other. For this purpose, secret key tables were distributed in advance to all authorized participants. To ensure security within such a large organization as the Kriegsmarine, there were many different key networks, as in the army and air force, for example Aegir for surface warships and auxiliary cruisers overseas, Hydra for warships near the coast, Medusa for U-boats in the Mediterranean, for battleships and heavy cruisers and Triton for the Atlantic submarines. There were other key nets. The Kriegsmarine initially used the Enigma-M3 exclusively for all of them.

However, the need was soon recognized to form a separate, specially secured key network for the Einheiten operating on the "Hohe See" (German for open sea or high seas). In October 1941, a letter from the Oberkommando der Kriegsmarine (OKM) to the Commander of the Battleships introduced the "Neptun key board" as a new key and ordered the use of the Enigma-M4 for this purpose. This took place four months before the M4 was put into service for the U-boats. Unlike Triton, the Neptun key network was not broken at the time.

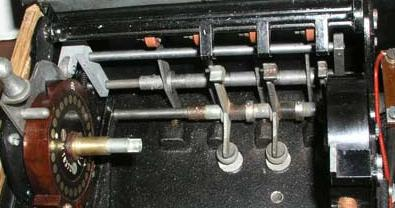
With the rollers removed, the thin reversing roller with its 26 contact plates can be seen on the left.

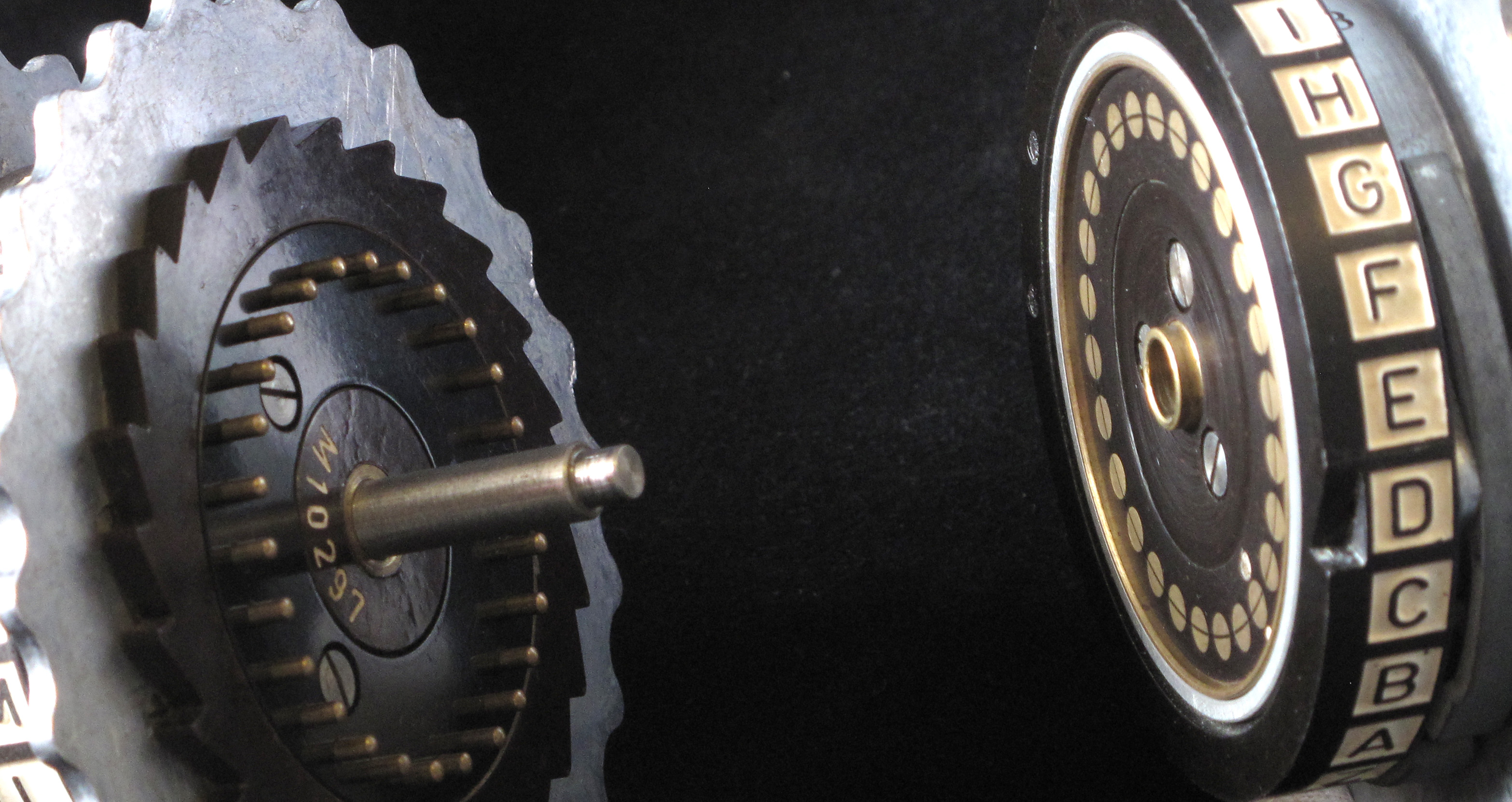
Two rollers of the Marine Enigma shortly before assembly.

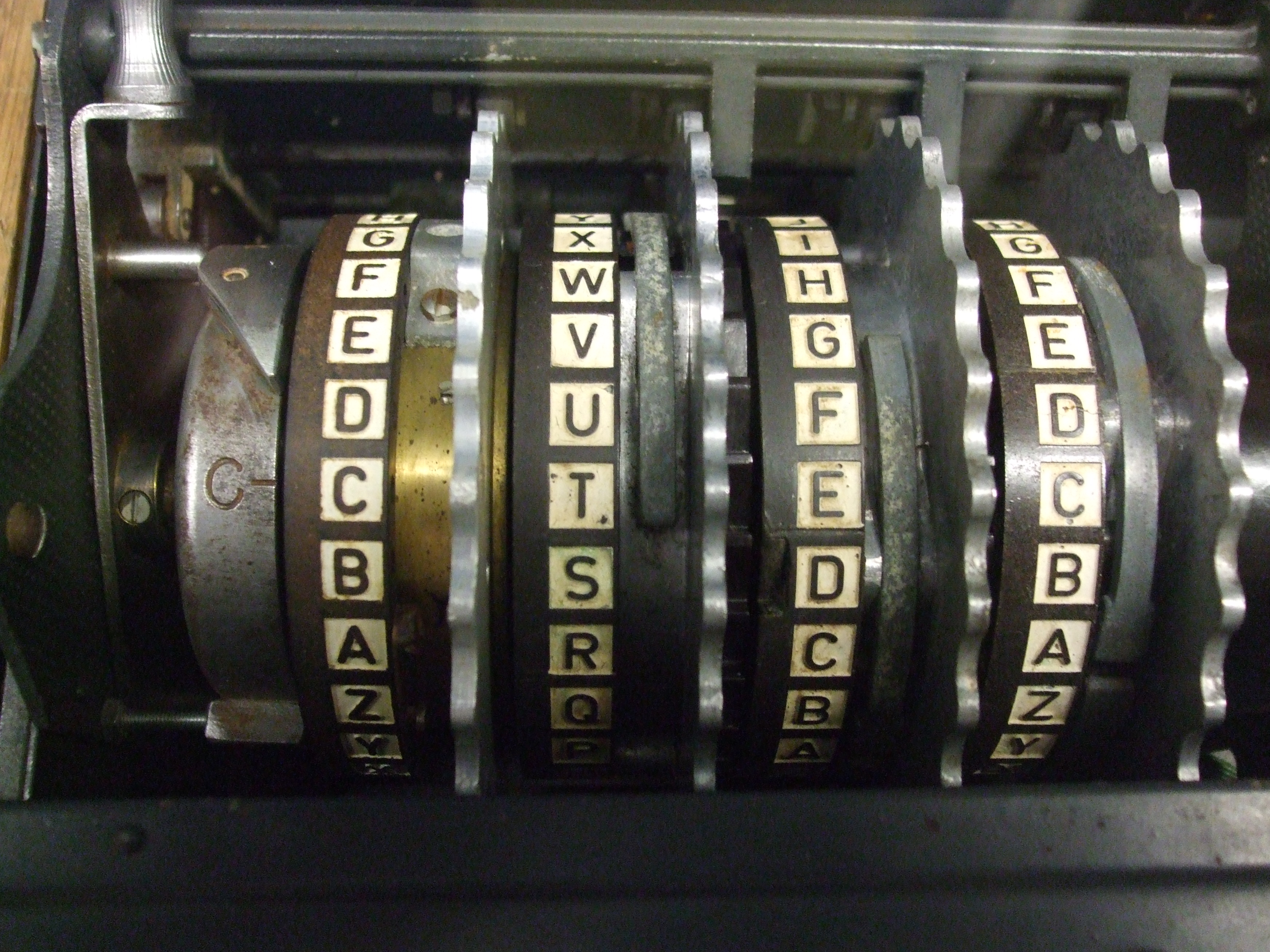
All the rollers are inserted here. On the far left is the thin FM C, called "Caesar" (indicated by the engraved "C-"), and immediately to the right is one of the "Greek rollers", which is not switched on during scrambling, but can be turned by hand to one of 26 positions (A to Z).

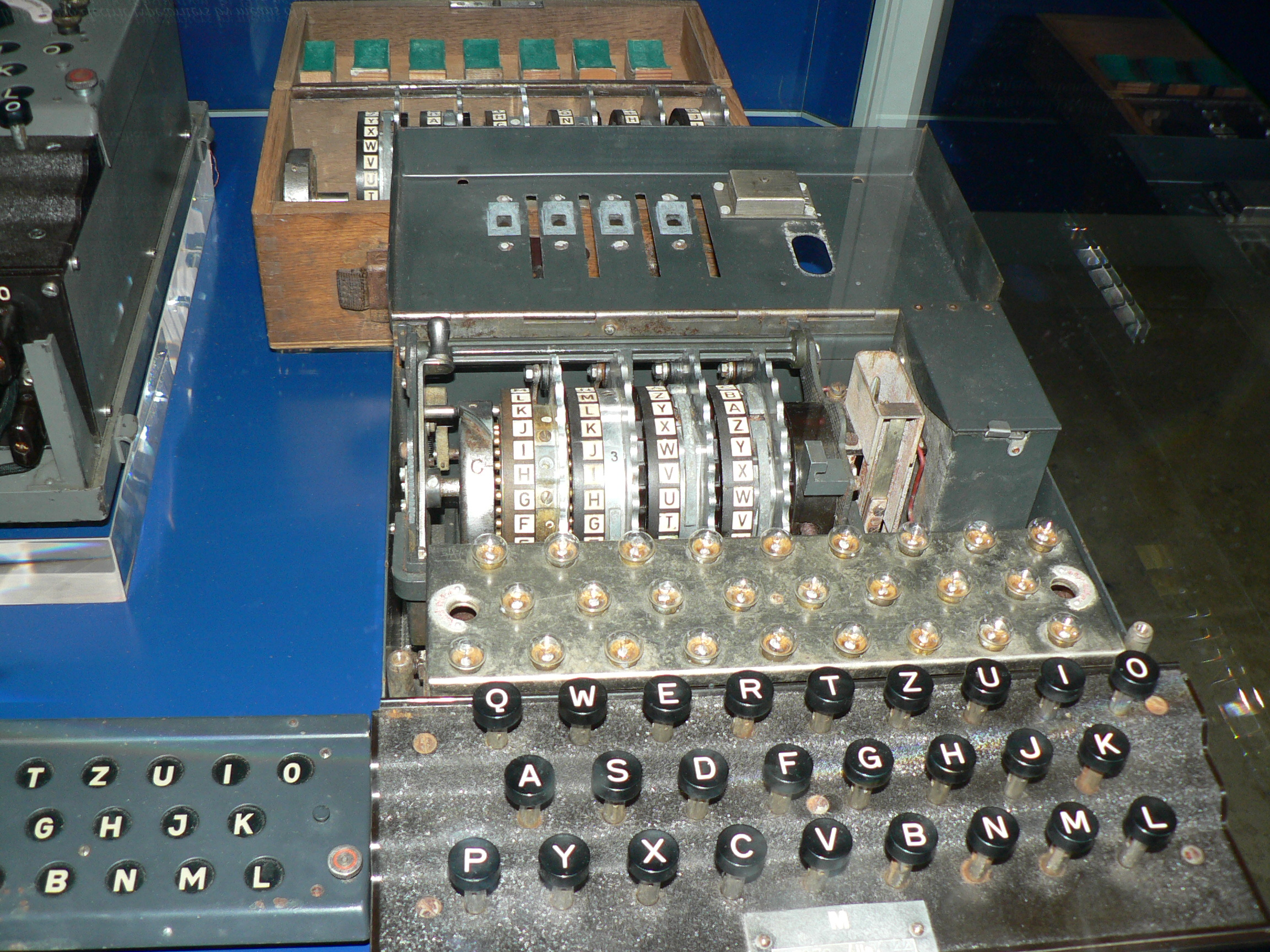
M4 (without cover) with fully inserted roller set.

== Structure ==
The construction of the Enigma-M4 has some special features compared to the Enigma I. The most important difference is the use of four rollers (rotors) compared to only three in the other models. The four rollers were selected from a range of eight plus two rollers. A distinction had to be made between rollers I to V, which were also used on the Enigma-I, and rollers VI to VIII, which were familiar from the Enigma-M3, and the two rollers specially designed for the Enigma-M4, which were thinner than the others and were therefore referred to as "thin" rollers.

The technical reason for the production of thin rollers was the Navy's desire to be able to continue using the same housing as Enigma I and Enigma-M3. For this purpose, the space previously occupied by a (thick) reversing roller now had to be used by a thin reversing roller and one of the newly added thin fourth rollers. Instead of Roman numerals, the thin rollers were marked with Greek letters, namely "β" (Beta) and "γ" (Gamma). Although they could each be manually rotated to one of 26 positions, unlike rollers I to VIII, they did not rotate any further during the encryption process.

The wiring diagram of the entry roller and the eight rotating rollers (I to VIII) of the Enigma-M4 was identical to the Enigma I and M3. In particular, the two non-rotating thin rollers "Beta" and "Gamma" and the two equally thin reversing rollers (UKW) "Bruno" and "Caesar". The wiring of the two thin rollers and the reversing rollers was designed in such a way that the combination of the reversing roller (UKW) with the "matching" roller (i.e. Bruno with Beta or Caesar with Gamma) results in exactly the same involutory character permutation as the reverse rollers B and C (thick) of the Enigma I and the Enigma-M3 alone. This served the purpose of backward compatibility with the earlier systems. The only requirement for this was that the spell key of the U-boats was chosen so that it began with "A". Then the left cylinder was in exactly the position in which it worked together with the matching VHF in the same way as the corresponding VHF of the other Enigma models.

As with the Model-D, the keys and lamps were arranged in a layout similar to QWERTZU. Only the letters P and L were shifted to the edges of the bottom row, in contrast to QWERTZU.

Q   W   E   R   T   Z   U   I   O
  A   S   D   F   G   H   J   K
P   Y   X   C   V   B   N   M   L

In contrast to other models such as the Model-D, Model-K or the Model-T, there was no support for digits on the keyboard. Special characters (as in the Model-G) were also not provided.

For data compression, the Navy used signal groups (four letters) and phrases from code books such as the Short signal bookletand the Weather short key which consisted purely of letters.

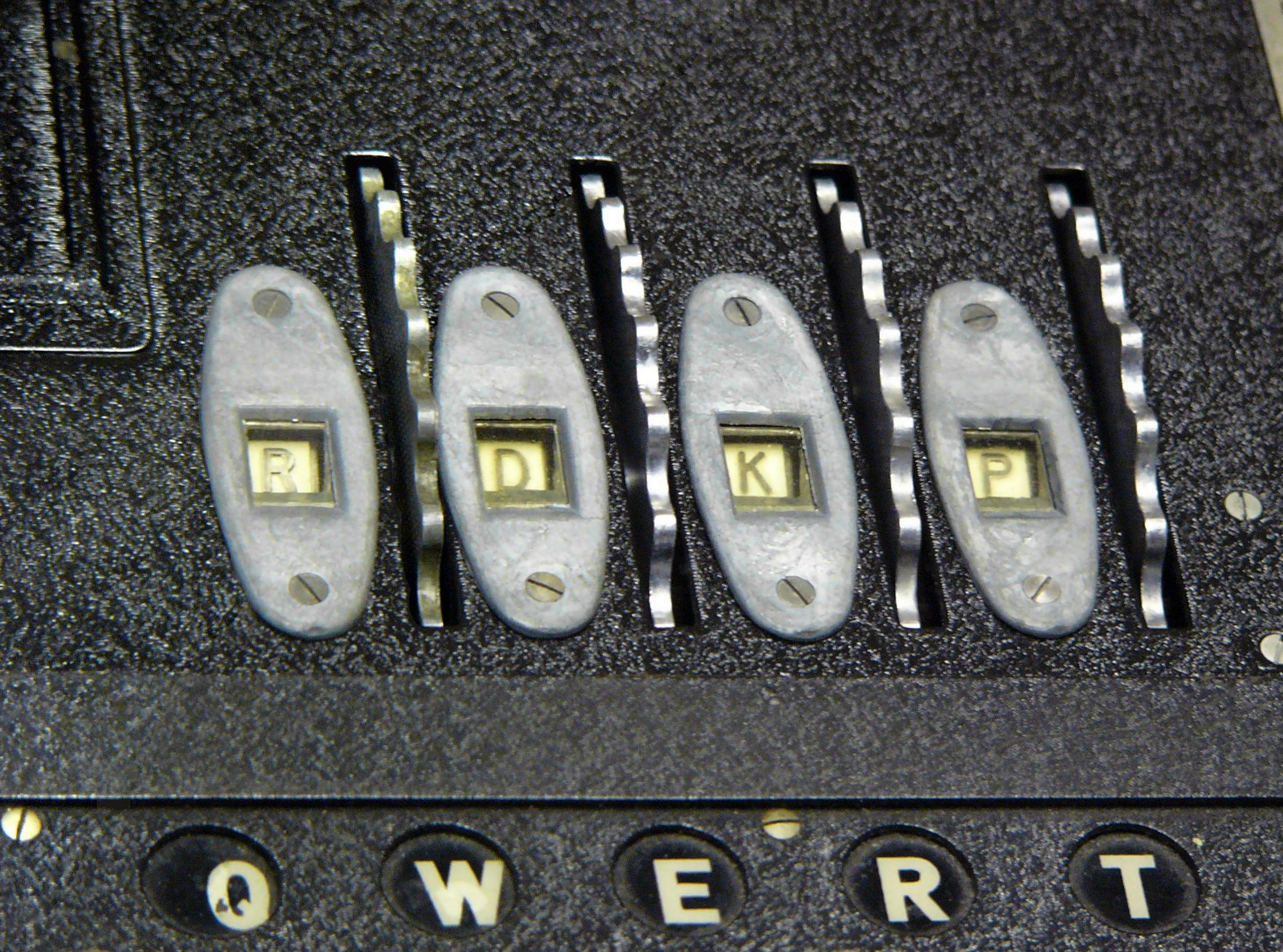
When the cover is closed, the "Greek roller" located behind the left-hand roller window can hardly be distinguished from the other rollers from the outside.

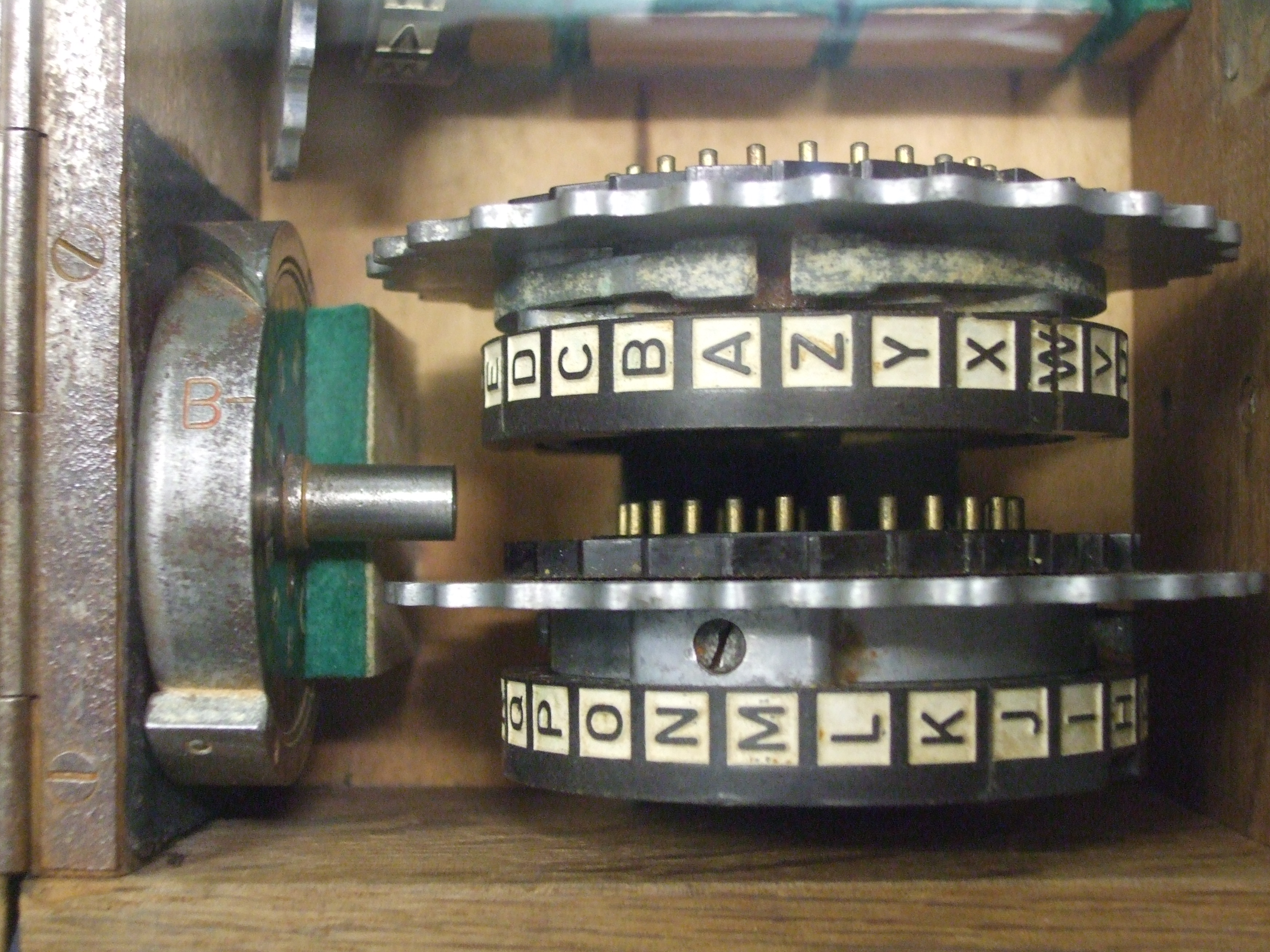
The "thin" VHF B (far left), also known as "Bruno", in the roller box of an M4 together with some rollers.

== Operation ==
To fully set the key, the navy distinguished between "outer" and "inner" key parts. The inner key included the selection of the rollers, the roller position and the ring position. The inner key settings could only be made by an officer, who opened the housing and selected, set up and arranged the rollers accordingly. He then closed the Enigma again and handed it over to the radio operator.

The radio operator's task was to make the external key settings, i.e. to insert the ten pairs of plugs into the plug board on the front panel of the M4 according to the day key, close the front flap and then turn the four rollers to the correct starting position. While the inner settings were only changed every two days, the outer settings had to be changed every day. The key change also took place on the high seas at 12:00 D.G.Z. ("German legal time"), for example early in the morning for U-boats operating off the American east coast.

The keys ordered were listed on top-secret "key boards" at the time. Here, too, a distinction was made between internal and external settings. The key board intended for the officer with the inner settings looked something like this:

                     Key M " T r i t o n "
                     ---------------------------
 Month: J u n e   1945                          Test number:  123
 ------                                         ----------------
                       Secret matter of command!
                        ----------------------
                     Key panel M-General
                     ---------------------------
                          (Schl.T. M Allg.)
                         Inner attitude
                         ------------------
                      Change 1200 h D.G.Z.
                      --------------------------
         ----------------------------------------------
         |Months- |                                   |
         |  ayd   |     Inner attitude            |
         ----------------------------------------------
         |  29.   |B  Beta       VII     IV      V    |
         |        |   A          G       N       O    |
         ----------------------------------------------
         |  27.   |B  Beta       II      I       VIII |
         |        |   A          T       Y       F    |
         ----------------------------------------------
         |  25.   |B  Beta       V       VI      I    |
         |        |   A          M       Q       T    |
         ----------------------------------------------

Only a few days of the month are shown above as an example, with the days sorted in descending order, as was customary at the time. This made it easy to cut off and destroy the "used" codes from previous days. The other key board, which listed the outer key parts, was similarly structured.

Example for June 27, 1945: Internal setting "B Beta II I VIII" means that the officer first had to select roller B (thin) as the reversing roller. Then he had to set the non-rotating Greek roller Beta to ring position A, roller II to ring position T, roller I to ring position Y and finally roller VIII on the far right (as a fast rotor) to ring position F and insert the rollers in the order from left to right. With a little feeling, the ring position could also be set on installed rollers. The officer locked the roller cover and handed the M4 over to the encryptor, who made the external settings using his own documents.

                     Key M " T r i t o n "
                     ---------------------------
 Month: J u n e   1945                          Test number:  123
 ------                                         ----------------
                        Secret commando matter!
                        ----------------------
                         Key panel M-General
                     ---------------------------
                          (Schl.T. M Allg.)
                         External setting
                         ------------------
                        Change 1200 h D.G.Z.
                      --------------------------
----------------------------------------------------------------------
| Mon-  |                                                    | Home - |
| ths-  |            P l u g c o n n e c t i o n s           | Posi-  |
| day   |                                                    | tion   |
----------------------------------------------------------------------
|  30. |18/26 17/4 21/6 3/16 19/14 22/7 8/1 12/25 5/9 10/15 |H F K D |
|  29. |20/13 2/3 10/4 21/24 12/1 6/5 16/18 15/8 7/11 23/26 |O M S R |
|  28. |9/14 4/5 18/24 3/16 20/26 23/21 12/19 13/2 22/6 1/8 |E Y D X |
|  27. |16/2 25/21 6/20 9/17 22/1 15/4 18/26 8/23 3/14 5/19 |T C X K |
|  26. |20/13 26/11 3/4 7/24 14/9 16/10 8/17 12/5 2/6 15/23 |Y S R B |

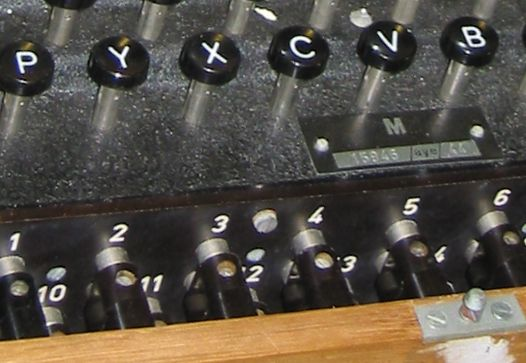
On the M4, the sockets were marked with numbers rather than letters. The type plate shows the production code aye for Olympia Büromaschinenwerke in Erfurt and the year 44 (for 1944).

The radio master had to connect the double-pole sockets on the front panel with corresponding double-pole cables. As a rule, exactly ten cables were plugged in. Six letters remained "unplugged". The plug connections in the navy (in contrast to the other parts of the Wehrmacht) were listed numerically and not alphabetically. In the corresponding secret Naval service regulations M.Dv.Nr. 32/1 with the title "Der Schlüssel M - Verfahren M Allgemein" a conversion table was given as an aid for the operator.

A	B	C	D	E	F	G	H	I	J	K	L	M	N	O	P	Q	R	S	T	U	V	W	X	Y	Z
01	02	03	04	05	06	07	08	09	10	11	12	13	14	15	16	17	18	19	20	21	22	23	24	25	26

Now, the key operator had to turn the four rollers to a defined starting position and the Enigma-M4 was ready to encrypt or decrypt radio messages.

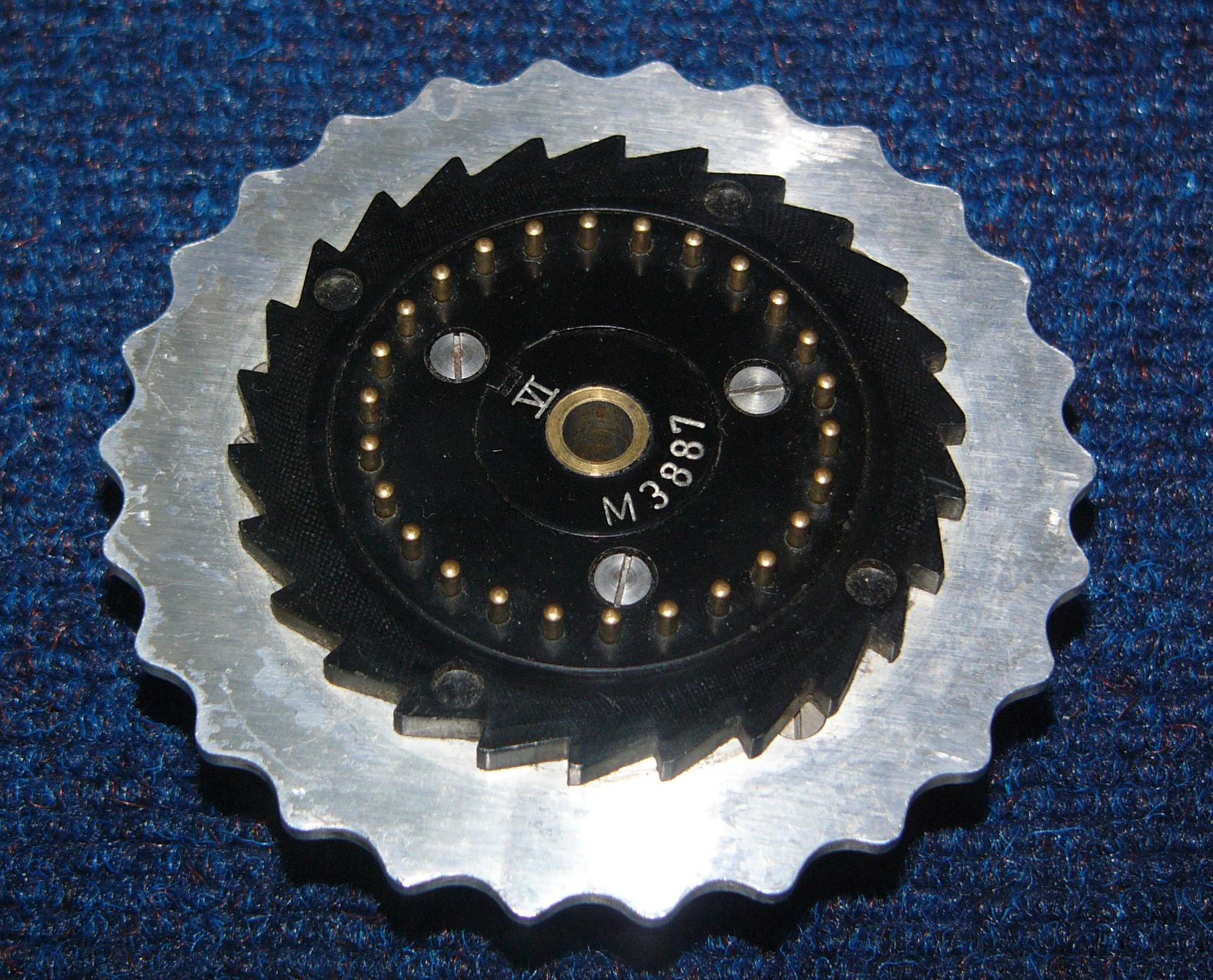
The reel marked with the Roman numeral VI is one of the three reels developed exclusively for the Navy.

== Key room ==
The size of the key space of the Enigma-M4 can be calculated from the four individual partial keys and the number of different key settings possible in each case. The total key space of the Enigma-M4 results from the following four factors:

a) die Walzenlage
Three out of eight reels are selected for the right three places. In addition, one of two Greek rollers for the left-hand position and one of two reversing rollers on the far left. This results in 2-2-(8-7-6) = 1344 possible roller positions (corresponds to a "key length" of about 10 bit).
b) the ring position
There are 26 different ring positions for each of the two right-hand rollers. The rings of the two left-hand rollers do not contribute to the enlargement of the key space, as the Greek roller is not indexed. A total of 26^{2} = 676 ring positions (corresponds to about 9 bits) are relevant.
c) the roller position
There are 26 different roller positions for each of the four rollers. (The reverse roller cannot be adjusted.) A total of 26^{4} = 456,976 roller positions are therefore available (corresponds to just under 19 bit). If the ring position is assumed to be known, 26^{3}-26^{2} = 16,900 initial positions to be eliminated as cryptographically redundant. This leaves 440,076 roller positions as relevant (also corresponds to about 19 bit).
d) the plug connections
A maximum of 13 plug connections can be made between the 26 letters. Based on the case of the empty connector board (considered as number zero in the table below), there are 26 options for the first connection for one connector end and then another 25 for the other end of the cable. This means that there are 26-25 different options for plugging in the first cable. However, as it does not matter in which order the two cable ends are plugged in, half of the options are omitted. This leaves 26-25/2 = 325 possibilities for the first connection. For the second, you get 24-23/2 = 276 possibilities. In general, there are (26-2n+2)-(26-2n+1)/2 possibilities for the n-th plug connection (see also: Gaussian summation formula).

Number of the plug-in connection	Opportunities for		Options for plug-in connection
Number of the plug-in connection	first page	second page	Options for plug-in connection
0	1	1	1
1	26	25	325
2	24	23	276
3	22	21	231
4	20	19	190
5	18	17	153
6	16	15	120
7	14	13	91
8	12	11	66
9	10	9	45
10	8	7	28
11	6	5	15
12	4	3	6
13	2	1	1

The total number of possible plug combinations when using several plugs results from the product of the possibilities for the individual plug connections. However, since the order of execution is not important here either (it is cryptographically equivalent if, for example, A is plugged in first with X and then B with Y or vice versa, first B with Y and then A with X), the corresponding cases must not be considered as key combinations. In the case of two plug connections, these are exactly half of the cases. The previously determined product must therefore be divided by 2. With three plug connections, there are 6 possible sequences for performing the plug connections, all six of which are cryptographically equivalent. The product must therefore be divided by 6. In the general case, with n plug connections, the product of the previously determined possibilities is divided by n! (Faculty). The number of possibilities for exactly n plug connections is given by

$$\frac{1}{n!} \prod_{i=1}^n \frac{(26-2i+2)(26-2i+1)}{2} \;=\; \frac{26!}{2^n\cdot n!\cdot(26-2n)!}$$

Plug	Opportunities for		
Plug	Plug-in connection	Exactly n plug-in connections	Up to n plug-in connections
0	1	1	1
1	325	325	326
2	276	44850	45176
3	231	3453450	3498626
4	190	164038875	167537501
5	153	5019589575	5187127076
6	120	100391791500	105578918576
7	91	1305093289500	1410672208076
8	66	10767019638375	12177691846451
9	45	53835098191875	66012790038326
10	28	150738274937250	216751064975576
11	15	205552193096250	422303258071826
12	6	102776096548125	525079354619951
13	1	7905853580625	532985208200576

For the M4, exactly ten plug connections had to be made. According to the table above, this results in 150,738,274,937,250 (more than 150 trillion) plug-in possibilities (corresponds to about 47 bits).

The total key space of an Enigma-M4 with three rollers selected from a stock of eight, one of two Greek rollers and one of two reverse rollers and using ten connectors can be calculated from the product of the 1,344 roller positions, 676 ring positions, 439,400 roller positions and 150,738,274,937,250 connector possibilities determined in sections a) to d) above. It amounts to:

1,344 · 676 · 439,400 · 150,738,274,937,250 = 60,176,864,903,260,346,841,600,000

That is more than 6-10^{25} possibilities and corresponds to a key length of almost 86 bit.

The key room is huge. However, as explained in more detail in the Main article about the Enigma, the size of the keyspace is only a necessary, but not a sufficient condition for the security of a cryptographic method. Even a method as simple as a simple monoalphabetic substitution (using 26 letters like the M4) has a key space of 26! (factorial), which is roughly 4-10^{26} and corresponds to about 88 bits and is thus even slightly larger than the Enigma-M4. Nevertheless, a monoalphabetic substitution is very uncertain and can easily be broken (deciphered).

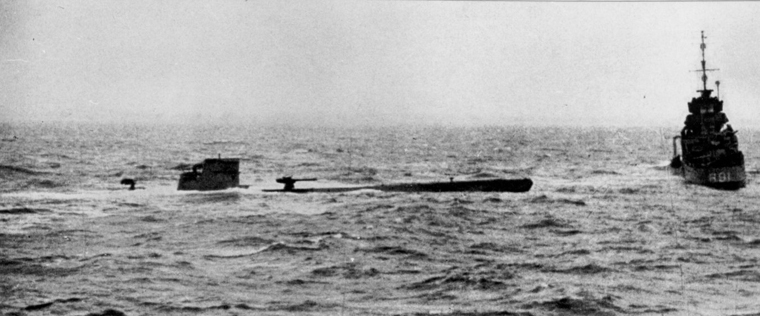
U-110 und HMS Bulldog

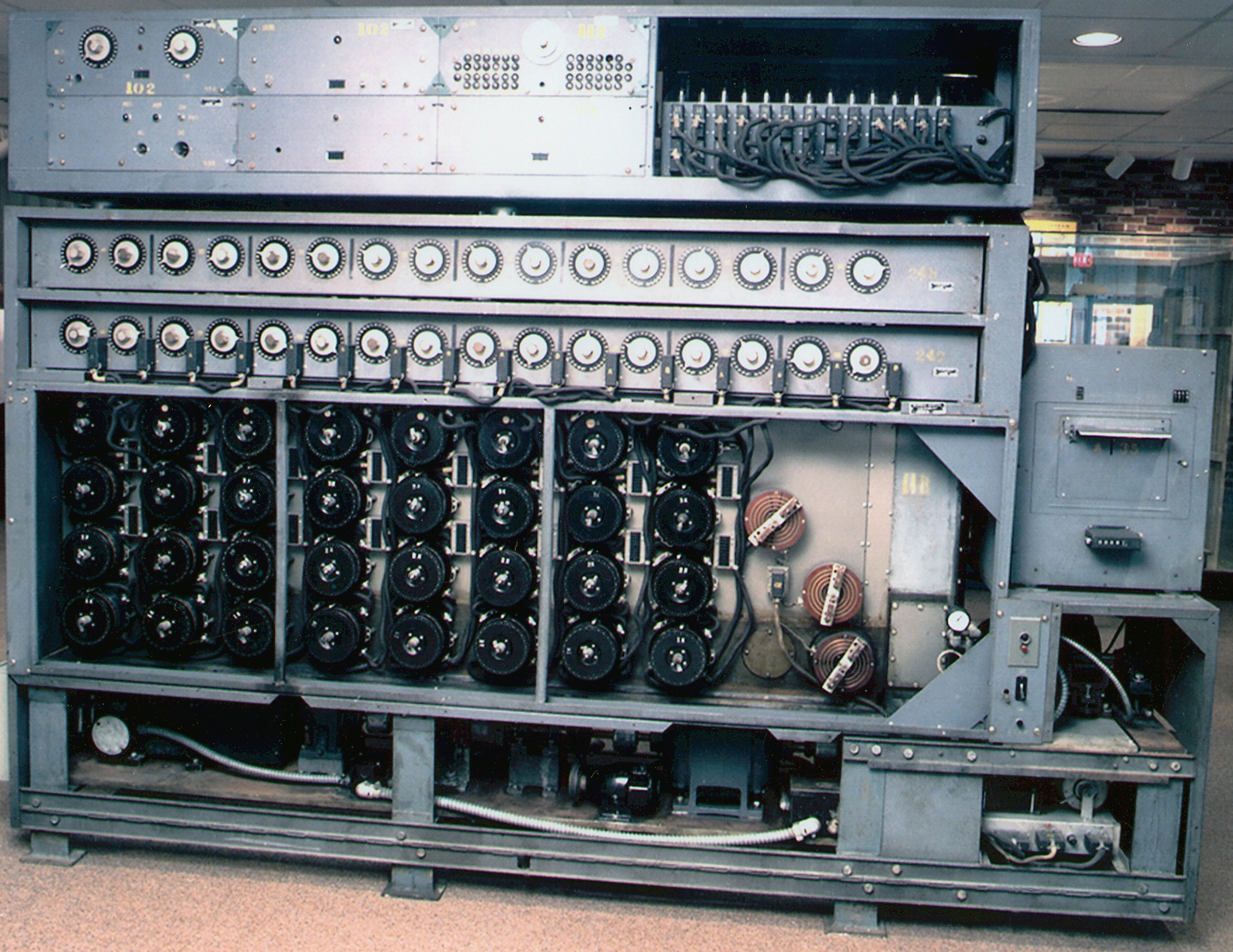
The only surviving Desch bomb in the National Cryptologic Museum

== Deciphering ==
British cryptanalysts had been working on the deciphering the Enigma at Bletchley Park, about 70 km (43 mi) northwest of London, since the outbreak of the war. The most important tool was a special electromechanical machine called the Turing bomb, which was invented by the English mathematician Alan Turing and which could be used to determine the valid day keys. This required "probable words", i.e. text passages that appear in the plaintext to be deciphered. The cryptanalysts benefited from the German thoroughness in writing routine messages, such as weather reports, with recurring patterns that could be used for deciphering. With the help of the Turing bomb, it was possible from January 1940 to decipher first the radio messages encrypted by the Luftwaffe and later also those of the army.

The encryption method used by the Kriegsmarine, i.e. the Schlüssel M, proved to be much more resistant to decryption attempts. Even the Enigma-M3, with its only three (and not yet four) cylinders, was more difficult to break than the Enigma I used by the Luftwaffe and the army. In addition to the use of a larger range of cylinders (eight instead of just five to choose from), this was also largely due to a particularly sophisticated Verfahren zur Spruchschlüsselvereinbarung, which the navy used. The British codebreakers only succeeded in breaking into the Schlüssel M in May 1941 after capture of the German U-boat U-110 together with an intact M3 engine and all secret documents (codebooks) including the important double-letter exchange boards by the British destroyer HMS Bulldog on May 9, 1941.

There was a particularly painful interruption ("black-out") for the British when the M3 was replaced by the M4 (with four rollers) in the U-boats on February 1, 1942. This procedure, called Schlüsselnetz Triton by the Germans and "Shark" (German: "Hai") by the British, could not be broken for ten months, a period called by the U-boat sailors the "Second Happy Time", during which the German U-boats again scored major successes. The break-in in "Shark" was not achieved until December 1942, after the British destroyer Petard took down the German U-boat U-559 in the Mediterranean Sea on October 30, 1942. U-559 was boarded and important secret key documents were captured such as short signal booklet and weather shortcut key, with the help of which Bletchley Park also managed to overcome the Enigma-M4 and Triton. However, it initially took several days to decipher the messages, which reduced the information value.

From 1943, the Americans came to the rescue, under the leadership of Joseph Desch at the United States Naval Computing Machine Laboratory (NCML), based at the National Cash Register Company (NCR) in Dayton (Ohio), more than 120 units as of April 1943 produced high-speed variants of the British bomb that were specifically targeted against the M4. American agencies, such as the Signal Security Agency (SSA), the Communications Supplementary Activity (CSAW), and the United States Coast Guard Unit 387 (USCG Unit 387) relieved the British of much of the time-consuming day-to-day key finding and were able to break Triton quickly and routinely. The British now left the M4's key detection to their American allies and their fast Desch Bombes. From September 1943, deciphering M4 radio messages usually took less than 24 hours. Even if a radio message could be completely deciphered, not all parts were always understandable, because position information was "overcoded" using a special procedure and thus specially protected. The Kriegsmarine had introduced the so-called address book procedure for this purpose in November 1941.

On June 4, 1944, the capture of U-505 again brought up-to-date key material: short signal booklet, identification group booklet and, above all, the so-called address book procedure. This was the urgently sought secret procedure for overcoding the U-boat locations. The yield of secret material from U-505 equaled that of U–110 and U–559.

Throughout the war, more than a million naval radio messages were deciphered in Hut Eight (Barrack 8) at Bletchley Park more than one million naval radio messages were deciphered. This covers the period from the fall of 1941 until the unconditional surrender of the Wehrmacht in May 1945, whereby, with the exception of the "blackout" between February and December 1942, it was possible to maintain the uninterrupted nature of deciphering for most of the time.

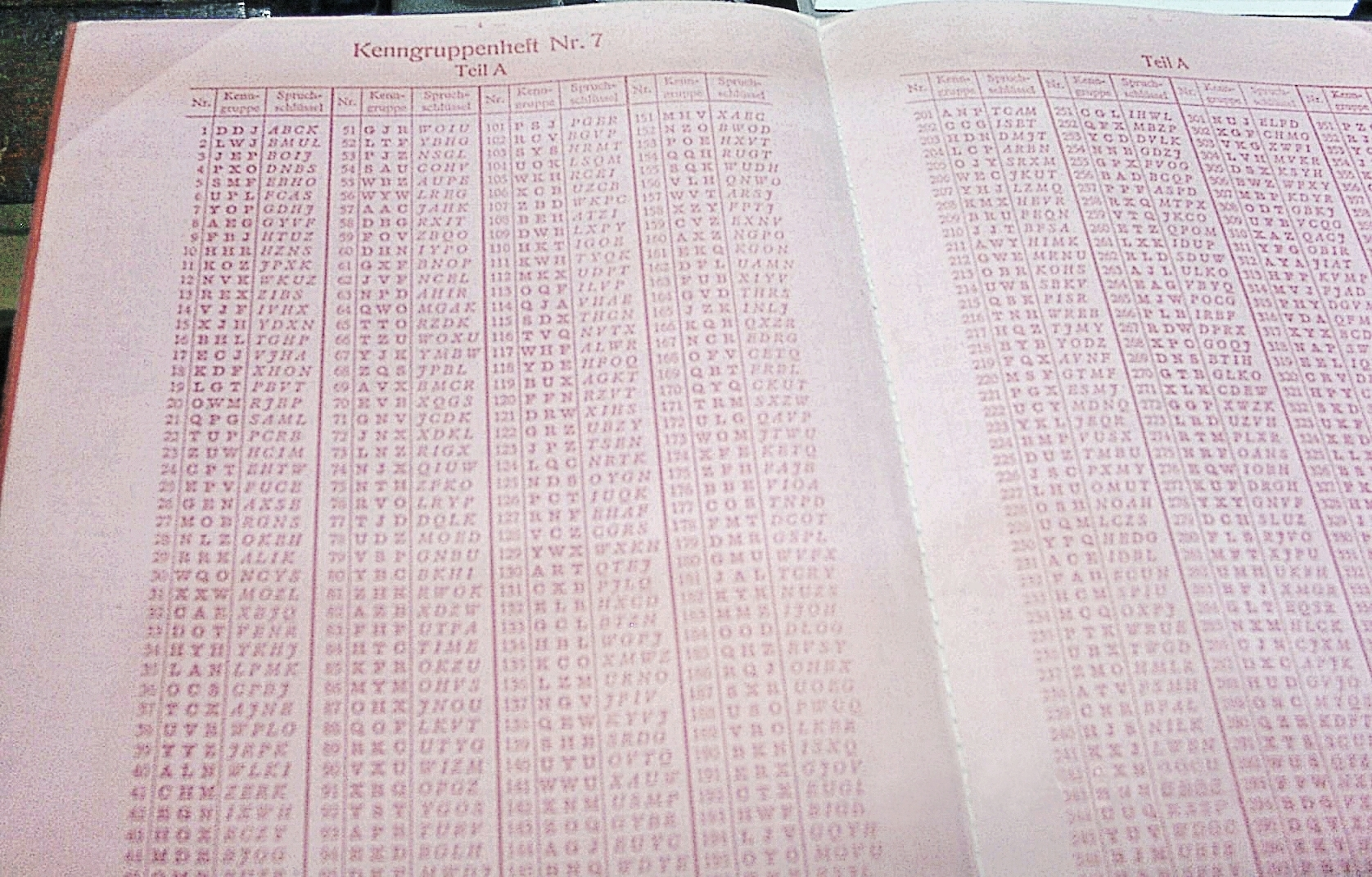
Identification group booklet captured by the Americans from U-505

== Significance for the history of war ==
The decoding of the M4 radio traffic was of enormous importance for the Allied Progress in der U-Boot-Abwehr. The reports from the boats with precise position and course information provided the Allies with a complete strategic situation picture. The U-boats also betrayed themselves simply by sending radio telegrams, which could be detected and localized by radio direction finding such as Huff-Duff by Allied warships. Radar as a means of radiolocation at sea and ASDIC, an early form of sonar, for sound detection under water was another important tactical tool for submarine hunting. But none of this provided as complete a picture of the situation as the radio transmissions.

The immediate consequence of the American decryptions was the sinking of eleven of the eighteen German Versorgungs-U-Boote ("Milchkühe") within a few months in 1943. This led to a weakening of all Atlantic U-boats, which could no longer be supplied at sea, but had to make the long and dangerous journey home through the Bay of Biscay to the U-boat bases on the French west coast.

Especially for the execution of Operation Overlord, the planned invasion of Normandy, it was crucial for the Allied leadership to have the most comprehensive, up-to-date and, of course, correct picture of the situation. After the capture of U 505 immediately before the planned D-Day, which then took place two days later on June 6, they feared that the German key procedures could suddenly be changed as a result of the capture of U 505 becoming known. This might have prevented the breaking of the Enigma keys on the day of the invasion, with potentially fatal consequences for the invasion forces. In fact, however, everything remained unchanged and so the day key could be broken in less than two hours after midnight using the Cribs "WETTERVORHERSAGEBISKAYA", which the British cryptanalysts could easily guess and assumed correctly and the invasion succeeded.

Many German U-boat drivers, above all the former chief of the B-Dienst (observation service) of the Kriegsmarine, were still very sure long after the war that "their" four-roller key machine was "unbreakable". When British information became known in 1974 which clearly proved that the opposite was the case, this caused a real shock among the survivors of the U-boat war, because of the approximately 40,000 German submariners, around 30,000 had not returned home from deployment - the highest loss rate of all German branches of the armed forces. The special historical significance of the Enigma-M4 and its decryption is underlined by a statement made by former British Prime Minister Winston Churchill: "The only thing that really frightened me during the war was the U-boat peril." (German: "Das einzige, wovor ich im Krieg wirklich Angst hatte, war die U-Boot-Gefahr.")

== Security check ==
Due to various suspicious events, the German side conducted several investigations into the security of its own machine. A significant example of the German considerations, procedures, conclusions and measures derived from them can be found in an English-language, highly secret interrogation protocol classified at the time as TOP SECRET "ULTRA", which was published immediately after the war, on June 21, 1945, by the Allied (British-American) TICOM (Target Intelligence Committee) at the Marine Intelligence School in Flensburg-Mürwik. It records the statements of the German naval officer, Lt.z.S Hans-Joachim Frowein, who from July to December 1944 had been assigned to the OKM/4 Skl II (Abteilung II der Seekriegsleitung) to investigate the safety of the M4. The leading German cryptanalyst Wilhelm Tranow, who was also interrogated in this context, explained that the reason for this investigation was the extremely high rate of losses suffered by the German U-boats, particularly in 1943 and the first half of 1944. The German naval command could not explain this, especially why U-boats were sunk in very specific positions, and again asked themselves the question: "Is the machine safe?"

To clarify this question, Frowein was seconded from Skl III to Skl II for six months from July 1944 with the order to carry out a thorough investigation into the safety of the four-roller Enigma. Two other officers and ten men were assigned to him for this purpose. They began their investigations with the assumption that the enemy knew the machine, including all the rollers, and that they had a suspected clear text (Crib) of 25 letters in length. The reason for choosing this relatively short crib length was their knowledge that U-Boat radio messages were often very short. The result of their investigation was that this was sufficient to open up the roller position and plug.

Frowein was able to explain in detail to the British interrogators his thoughts and procedures at the time when it came to unraveling his own machine. Although neither he nor any of his colleagues had any previous experience in the cryptanalysis of key machines, such as the commercial Enigma, they had succeeded in breaking the M4 within six months, at least in theory. The methods developed were strikingly similar to those actually used by the British in B.P., but of course Frowein did not know this. As he went on to explain, he had also realized that his break-in method would be severely disrupted if the left or middle roller within the crib were to advance. This would have required case distinctions in the cryptanalysis, which would have increased the workload by a factor of 26, which was considered to be practically unacceptably high for a potential attacker.

After presenting the results, the naval command came to the conclusion that although the M3 and even the M4 were theoretically vulnerable to attack, this would no longer be the case if it was ensured that the roller advance (of the middle roller) occurred sufficiently frequently. In December 1944, it was therefore ordered that, with immediate effect, only rollers with two Transfer notches, i.e. one of rollers VI, VII or VIII, could be used as the right-hand roller. This measure more than halved the number of possible roller positions (from 8-7-6 = 336 to 7-6-3 = 126), which meant a weakening of the combinatorial complexity (reduction by factor 3/8 or about 1.4 bit), but at the same time strengthened the machine against the recognized weakness.

The Kriegsmarine also passed on the results of the investigation to the other parts of the Wehrmacht, which continued to use only the Enigma I, which was cryptographically weaker than the M4, with only three cylinders and the resulting 60 cylinder layers. According to Frowein's statement in the TICOM report, the Heeresführung was "astonished at the Navy's view based on this investigation" (...the Army were astonished at the Navy's view based on this investigation).

== Timeline ==
The following is a list of some important dates in the history of the Enigma-M4.

Date	Event
October 15, 1941	Introduction of the "Neptune" key network for the battleships with the M4
November 1941	Introduction of the address book procedure to conceal position details
February 1, 1942	Introduction of the M4 now also for the U-boats (initially only Greek roller β)
October 30, 1942	HMS Petard captures second edition of the weather shortcut key from U-559
December 12, 1942	Bletchley Park succeeds in breaking into Triton
March 10, 1943	Third edition of the weather abbreviation
July 1, 1943	Introduction of the Greek roller γ
June 5, 1944	Recovery of short signal booklet, identification group booklet, address book and an M4 from U-505

Breakage of the key M
Year	J	F	M	A	M	J	J	A	S	O	N	D
1939									o	o	o	o
1940	o	o	o	o	o	o	o	o	o	o	o	o
1941	o	o	o	o	#	#	#	#	#	o	#	#
1942	#	o	o	o	o	o	o	o	o	o	o	#
1943	#	#	o	#	#	#	#	#	#	#	#	#
1944	#	#	#	#	#	#	#	#	#	#	#	#
1945	#	#	#	#	#							

Legend: o No deciphering # Deciphering succeeds

The three gaps (o) in the deciphering ability of the Allies are striking. The reasons for this are:

- In October 1941, "Triton" was formed as a separate key network just for the U-boats (initially still with the M3).
- In February 1942, the M4 was introduced for the U-boats, which could only be overcome ten months later in December ("second happy time").
- In March 1943, there was a new edition of the weather shortcut. From September 1943, the M4 radio messages were usually broken within 24 hours.

The M4 was manufactured from 1941, initially at the main Konski & Krüger production plant in Berlin. (K&K) in Berlin. From 1942, production was also outsourced to other locations (see also: List of Enigma production codes). A large proportion (around 45%) of the production of the M4 from 1942 was carried out by Olympia Büromaschinenwerke AG in Erfurt. The following figures are available:

Year	Number K&K	Anz. Olympia
1942	1011	–
1942	1450	–
1943	2238	300
1944	1500	2870
1945	–	800

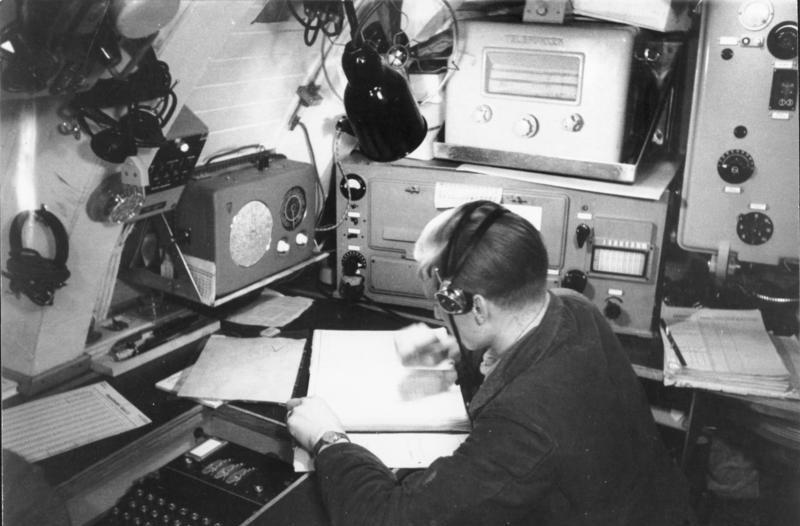
In this photo from March 1941, just under a year before the M4 entered service on February 1, 1942, an M3 can still be seen in the U-124's radio locker, which also served as a key room.

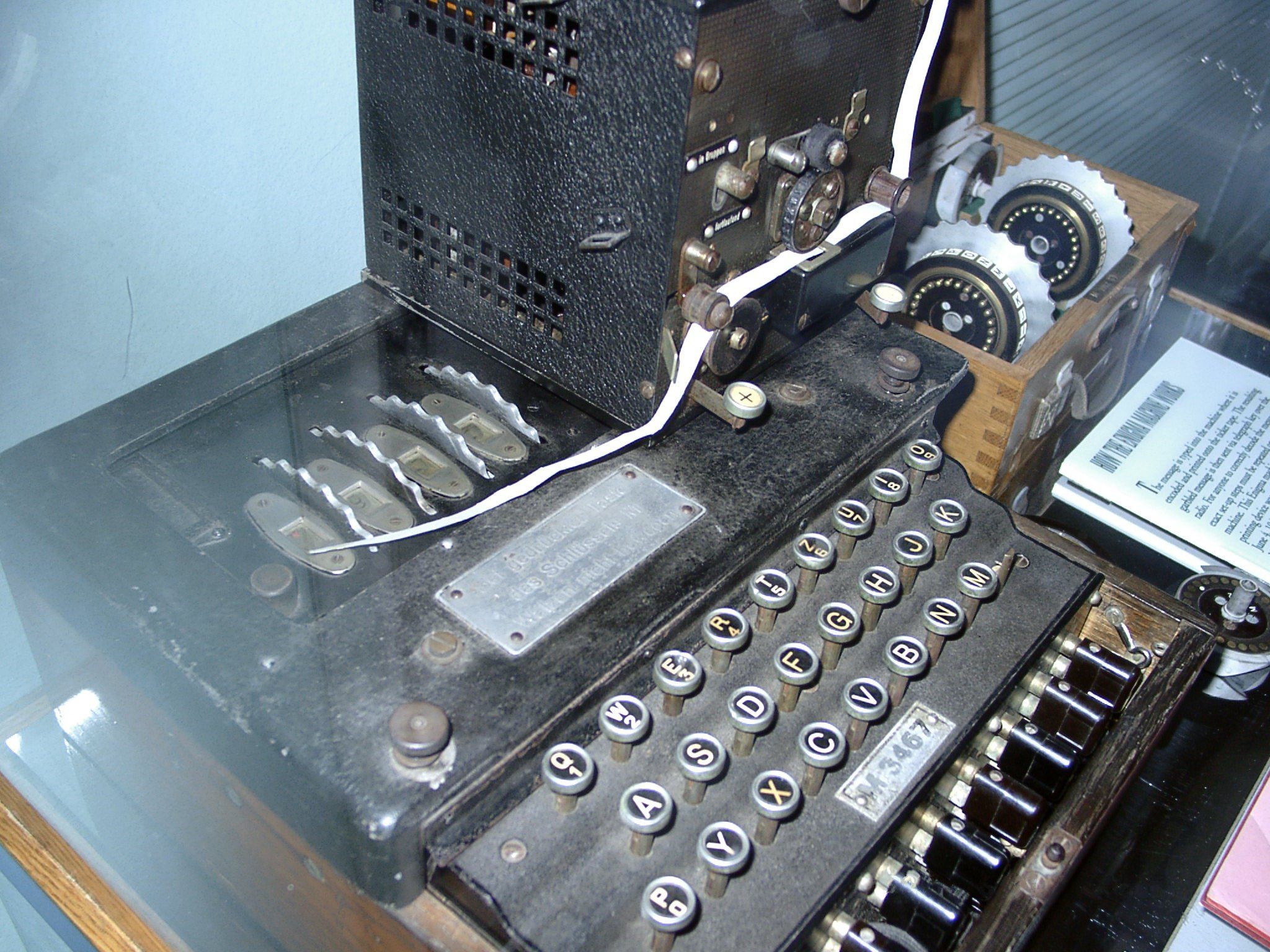
This M4, captured from the German submarine U-505, is equipped with the "Schreibmax", which made the laborious reading of the letter lamps a thing of the past.

== Authentic radio message ==
An example is a communication from Lieutenant Captain Hartwig Looks, commander of the German U-boat U 264, which was encrypted with an Enigma-M4 on November 19, 1942, shortly before the end of the black-out. Before the encryption, the radio operator transmitted the text in Enigma notation, which he then encrypted letter by letter with the M4 and finally sent the ciphertext in Morse code. As the Enigma can only encode uppercase letters, numbers were written out digit by digit, punctuation marks were replaced by "Y" for comma and "X" for period, proper names were enclosed in "J" and important terms or letters were doubled or tripled to protect against misunderstandings caused by transmission errors. It was also customary for the navy to arrange the text in groups of four, while the army and air force used groups of five. Short radio messages and the almost unavoidable spelling and transmission errors in practice make deciphering based on statistical analyses difficult.

A more detailed plaintext:

By U 264 Hartwig Looks - Radio Telegram 1132/19 - Contents:
During an attack by depth charge (ordnance)/water bombs we were pushed under water. The last enemy location we detected was at 8:30 o'clock in naval square AJ 9863 (51.550°N 41.583°W), heading 220 degrees, speed 8 knot. We are joining. Weather data: barometric pressure 1014 millibar falling. wind from north-northeast, strength 4. Visibility 10 nautical miles.

Shortened plain text:

From Looks - FT 1132/19 - Contents:

Pressed under water during attack, Wabos.

Last enemy position 0830 hrs Mar.-Qu. AJ 9863, 220 degrees, 8 nm.

Push to. 14 mb, falling. NNO 4. visibility 10.

Transcribed plain text in groups of four:

vonv onjl ooks jfff ttte inse insd reiz woyy eins
neun inha ltxx beia ngri ffun terw asse rged ruec
ktyw abos xlet zter gegn erst andn ulac htdr einu
luhr marq uant onjo tane unac htse chsd reiy zwoz
wonu lgra dyac htsm ysto ssen achx eins vier mbfa
ellt ynnn nnno oovi erys icht eins null

Ciphertext (with spelling and transcription errors):

NCZW VUSX PNYM INHZ XMQX SFWX WLKJ AHSH NMCO CCAK
UQPM KCSM HKSE INJU SBLK IOSX CKUB HMLL XCSJ USRR
DVKO HULX WCCB GVLI YXEO AHXR HKKF VDRE WEZL XOBA
FGYU JQUK GRTV UKAM EURB VEKS UHHV OYHA BCJW MAKL
FKLM YFVN RIZR VVRT KOFD ANJM OLBG FFLE OPRG TFLV
RHOW OPBE KVWM UQFM PWPA RMFH AGKX IIBG

The ciphertext could be deciphered on February 2, 2006, with the following key settings:

Basic position and key:

Roller position: UKW Bruno-Beta-II-IV-I
Ring position: AAAV
Plug: AT BL DF GJ HM NW OP QY RZ VX
Saying key: VJNA

Deciphered text (with spelling and transcription errors, breaks and spaces for readability):

von von j looks j hff ttt eins eins drei zwo yy qnns neun inhalt xx
bei angriff unter wasser gedrueckt y
wabos x letzter gegnerstand nul acht drei nul uhr mar qu anton jota neun acht seyhs drei y
zwo zwo nul grad y acht sm y
stosse nach x
ekns vier mb faellt y nnn nnn ooo vier y sicht eins null

At 232 characters (group number 58), the text is unusually long and uses neither a short signal booklet nor the weather abbreviation key.

The weather information "Air pressure 1014 mb falling, wind north-north-east with 4 Bft, visibility 10 nm" would have been shortened by a weather abbreviation (WKS) to 8 characters

hrbw apeh

instead of the 44 characters used

eins vier mbfa ellt ynnn nnno oovi erys icht eins null

== Literature ==
- Arthur O. Bauer: Funkpeilung als alliierte Waffe gegen deutsche U-Boote 1939–1945. Self-published, Diemen Netherlands 1997, ISBN 3-00-002142-6.
- Friedrich L. Bauer: Entzifferte Geheimnisse. Methoden und Maximen der Kryptologie. 3rd, revised and expanded edition. Springer, Berlin u. a. 2000, ISBN 3-540-67931-6.
- Ralph Erskine, Frode Weierud: Naval Enigma – M4 and its Rotors. In: Cryptologia. Band 11, Nr. 4, 1987, p. 235–244, doi:10.1080/0161-118791862063.
- Stephen Harper: Kampf um Enigma. Die Jagd auf U-559. Mittler, Hamburg 2001, ISBN 3-8132-0737-4.
- OKM: Der Schlüssel M – Verfahren M Allgemein. Berlin 1940. cryptomuseum.com (PDF; 3,3 MB)
- Joachim Schröder: Folgenschwerer Fund – Der „Fall" U 110 und die sensationelle Erbeutung der „Enigma". In: Clausewitz – Das Magazin für Militärgeschichte, Heft 1, 2015, p. 56–61.
- Hugh Sebag-Montefiore: Enigma – The battle for the code. Cassell Military Paperbacks, London 2004, ISBN 0-304-36662-5.
