= Albouy =

Albouy is a surname. Notable people with the surname include:

- Alexandre Albouy (born 1979), French rugby union player
- Gérard Albouy (1912–1985), French milliner
