= Papier collé =

Type of collage and collaging technique

Fruit Dish and Glass, papier collé and charcoal on paper, 1912, by Georges Braque.

Papier collé (French: pasted paper or paper cut outs) is a type of collage and collaging technique in which paper is adhered to a flat mount. The difference between collage and papier collé is that the latter refers exclusively to the use of paper, while the former may incorporate other two-dimension (non-paper) components. As the term papier collé is not commonly used, this type of work is often simply called collage.

Cubist painter Georges Braque, inspired by Pablo Picasso's collage method, invented the technique and first used it in his 1912 work, Fruit Dish and Glass. Braque continued to use the technique in works such as Bottle, Newspaper, Pipe, and Glass.

Papier collé is primarily used to refer specifically to the paper collages of the Cubists.

== Notable collage artists ==
Some of the notable collage artists are:

- Georges Braque
- Joseph Cornell
- Juan Gris
- Henri Matisse
- Robert Motherwell
- Sergei Parajanov
- Pablo Picasso
- Robert Rauschenberg
- Kurt Schwitters
- Brian Clarke
- Kara Walker
