= Bottle, Glass, Fork =

Painting by Pablo Picasso

- Bouteille, Verre, et Fourchette (French)
- Artist: Pablo Picasso
- Year: 1912
- Medium: Oil on Canvas
- Location: Cleveland Museum of Art, Cleveland
- Accession: 1972.8

Bottle, Glass, Fork (French: Bouteille, Verre, et Fourchette) is an oil on canvas painting by Pablo Picasso (1881–1973). It was painted in the spring of 1912, at the height of the development of Analytic Cubism. Bottle, Glass, Fork is one of the best representations of the point in Picasso's career when his Cubist painting reached almost full abstraction. The analytic phase of Cubism was an original art movement developed by Picasso and his contemporary Georges Braque (1882–1963) and lasted from 1908-1912. Like Bottle, Glass, Fork, the paintings of this movement are characterized by the limited use of color, and a complex, elegant composition of small, fragmented, tightly interwoven planes within an all-over composition of broader planes. While the figures in Bottle, Glass, Fork can be difficult to discern, the objects do emerge after careful study of the painting. The painting is displayed in the Cleveland Museum of Art.

== Description ==
Bottle, Glass, Fork was painted with oils on canvas, in monochromatic shades of brown, grey, black, and white. The painting itself takes an oval shape, although it is now placed in a rectangular frame that measures 93 cm tall and 76 cm wide (37 inches tall and 30 inches wide). Bottle, Glass, Fork can be seen in the Cleveland Museum of Art in Cleveland, Ohio, with other notable paintings by Picasso, including Woman in a Cape (1901), La Vie (1903), and Harlequin with Violin (1918). Picasso's purpose in painting Bottle, Glass, Fork was to examine a still-life of everyday objects in terms of flat planes, thoroughly redefining their structural and spatial relationships. Picasso avoided the use of strong color in this analytical painting, instead relying on the contrasts of tonal shading in brown, gray, black and white to create forms and strengthen spatial interaction. There is no clear perspective in the painting, although a shallow sense of space can be discerned through the overlapping shapes and forms, which creates a step-by-step movement back into the picture plane. The viewer's eye is guided around the painting and into the center by the presence of curving black lines that mimic the oval shape of the canvas, although the composition remains chiefly architectural. Bottle, Glass, Fork presents a highly ordered structure that is meant to represent a still-life of objects arranged on a café table, although the forms are initially difficult to distinguish.

== Interpretation ==
The title of the painting, Bottle, Glass, Fork, is the first indication that Picasso is portraying a still-life, perhaps set on a table at one of the cafés in Paris that Picasso and his contemporaries frequented. The bottle is the largest whole plane on the canvas, placed in the upper-left quadrant of the oval. Its cylindrical shape is indicated by the highlights and shading, making the bottle appear rounded in comparison with the other planes. The glass is harder to place, as there are several half-circle shapes that look as though they could represent goblets. However, an oval atop a shaded triangle, which sits next to another shaded triangle, which are both presented above a cylindrical glass stem, form a collection of shapes that are reminiscent of a martini glass in front of and to the left of the large bottle. The fork can be placed in the lower-right quadrant because of the short, curved black lines highlighted against a white parallelogram, indicating the prongs of the fork. Once the prongs are found, the viewer can make out the brown handle slightly below the prongs and separated from them by a small triangle.

With the title objects placed within the painting, other objects also begin to emerge from the geometric contours. At the very bottom and center of the painting there is a shape that resembles a key, perhaps to Picasso's art studio. The two small, swirling shapes diagonally to the right of the key might represent croissants to go along with the drinks in the bottle. Above the swirls there is a somewhat naturalistic depiction of a knife receding into space, indicating to the viewer that these objects actually do sit on a table that is both receding back and tilting up towards the surface of the painting.

Other significant compositional elements within Bottle, Glass, Fork have nothing to do with the title of the work, but are found in the letters that Picasso included, half-hidden behind the overlapping shapes. The most obvious are the bold, black letters, EAN above ARIS on a white background, which recalls a poster or a folded newspaper. "ARIS" most likely indicates the word "PARIS", but the EAN could indicate multiple meanings. It could be the word OCEAN, which would correspond with the nautical theme of the dockside café scenes in some of Picasso's previous still life paintings. Because of Picasso's tendency to reveal his radical political tendencies even in his most apolitical still lifes, it has been speculated that EAN forms part of the title of an anarchist Parisian newspaper, L'Intransigeant, or The Intransigent. The other set of letters is found on the upper left of the canvas and reads "e 20". These letters look as if they have been stenciled onto a streaky brown background resembling wood, indicating that they may be a part of a wooden sign. It is most likely that the letters refer to "Café 20", a popular meeting place for artists in fin de siècle Paris. This gives the viewer a final placement for the still-life, letting us know that we are seeing an everyday table setting in a liberal café that Picasso, his patrons, and their contemporaries frequented, where they could drink and exchange ideas about politics as they read the anarchist newspaper, art, literature, and their rapidly changing culture.

== Background and development ==
=== Paul Cézanne ===
Picasso and Braque's main source of inspiration when developing Cubism came from the still-life paintings of the Impressionist artist Paul Cézanne (1839–1906). Unlike many of his contemporary Impressionist painters, Cézanne was not concerned with capturing the ephemeral effects of light reflected off of the surfaces found in nature. Rather, he focused on creating an image of his "sensation" of the world, which he perceived as filled with solid, enduring forms. Cézanne integrated these forms into the space he created within his paintings while still respecting the flatness of the painted canvas; an example is his still life Basket of Apples (1895). His blocky brushstrokes lay parallel to the picture plane, creating a tension between flatness and spatial relationships that is found in Glass, Bottle, Fork. Cézanne also relied on the use of multiple perspectives in one painting to capture a sensation within an image, a principle that would become central to Picasso's Cubism.

=== Gustave Courbet ===
A less obvious, but still significant, influence on Analytical Cubism is the leader of the 19th-century Realist movement, Gustave Courbet (1819–1877). Courbet painted figural compositions, landscapes, and still life. He gained notoriety for commenting on social issues in his works and painting subject matter that was considered to be too vulgar to be painted, like the life of the peasants, the working conditions of the poor, and prostitution.

Although their work seems drastically different at first glance, Courbet's influence on Cubism can be found in Picasso's underlying goals. Just as Courbet attempted to present a realistic vision of his world, in Bottle, Glass, Fork Picasso attempts to create an accurate representation of the table in the café. Picasso's method of realism is not an accurate optical imitation of the natural world, but a more inclusive type of realism. He included many perspectives of an object and relied on the associations made in the mind of the viewer because of their own sensory experiences with the objects. An example of this is The Stone Breakers (1850).

== Painting as language ==
Picasso's works are often analyzed in terms of their relation to language. When attempting to make sense of Picasso's most sophisticated analytical Cubist paintings, many art historians approach the paintings as a branch of the hermetic language that art historian Natasha Staller described in her article, "Babel: Hermetic Languages, Universal Languages, and Anti-Languages in Fin de Siècle Parisian Culture." Hermetic languages are like codes and actually conceal a meaning that can only be deciphered by those privileged enough to have the key to breaking the code. Picasso seems to be actively employing this concept in Bottle, Glass, Fork. Although Picasso is dealing with very concrete subject matter, he has rejected the literal meaning of objects, instead preferring to create art that was "intentionally cryptic and obscure" and required that one be privy to the intellectual code of Cubist aesthetics and to understand the details of the alternative society of artists and intellectuals in which Picasso lived and worked.

== Impact on future art ==
The influence of analytical Cubist work like Bottle, Glass, Fork on future artist movements was enormous. Picasso and Braque created a highly original method of relating objects to each other within space, developing a technique of painting that created a whole sensory experience rather than just a visual experience. Their ideas and structure have influenced later movements like Orphism, Futurism, Expressionism, Dadaism, Purism, Synchromism, and every genre of later abstract art.

== See also ==
- Portrait of Ambroise Vollard
- Le pigeon aux petits pois
- Cubism
- List of Picasso artworks 1911–1920
