= Natasha Staller =

- Occupation: Art historian
- Spouse: Gary Ruvkun
- Children: 1
- Awards: Guggenheim Fellowship (2005)

Academic background
- Education: Wellesley College; Harvard University
- Thesis: Toward 'the total image': The Thematic Origins of Cubism (1983)

Academic work
- Discipline: Art history
- Sub-discipline: Pablo Picasso
- Institutions: Amherst College

Natasha Elena Staller is an American art historian. She is Professor of the History of Art at Amherst College. She wrote A Sum of Destructions: Picasso’s Cultures and the Creation of Cubism (2001) and is a 2005 Guggenheim Fellow.

== Biography ==
Staller was raised in Glencoe, Illinois, and as a child attended the School of the Art Institute of Chicago on a scholarship. She spent her last year in high school as an exchange student in Mexico. She obtained her BA from Wellesley College, where "art history was [her] eighth declared major". She also studied harpsichord with Lola Odiaga and photography with Minor White.

Staller obtained her PhD from Harvard University in 1983; her doctoral dissertation was titled Toward 'the total image': The Thematic Origins of Cubism. After visiting positions at the University of Chicago and Princeton University, he joined the Amherst College faculty in 1992.

Staller was a contributor to the catalog for the 1997 National Gallery of Art exhibition Picasso: The Early Years 1892-1906. In 2001, she published A Sum of Destructions: Picasso's Cultures and the Creation of Cubism, where she argued that Picasso's earlier career was connected to his Cubism style at a larger extent than previously thought. The book was a finalist for the 2003 Charles Rufus Morey Book Award, and the Society for Iberian Global Art awarded it and Jesús Escobar's The Plaza Mayor and the Shaping of Baroque Madrid the 2004 Eleanor Tufts Book Award. Choice also named the book an Outstanding Academic Title of the Year. In 2005, she was awarded a Guggenheim Fellowship. She has also appeared as a featured expert in several documentary works like Annenberg Learner's Art Through Time: A Global View, Picasso and Braque Go to the Movies, and The Private Life of a Masterpiece.

Staller is married to Gary Ruvkun; they have one daughter. She lives in Newton, Massachusetts.

== Works ==
- A Sum of Destructions: Picasso's Cultures and the Creation of Cubism (2001)
