= Woman with Cat (van Dongen) =

1908 Painting by Kees van Dongen

Woman with a Cat
- Artist: Kees van Dongen
- Year: 1908
- Medium: oil on canvas
- Dimensions: 91.76 cm × 73.66 cm (36.13 in × 29.00 in)
- Location: Milwaukee Art Museum, Milwaukee

Woman with Cat is an oil on canvas painting by Dutch-French Fauve painter Kees van Dongen, from 1908. It depicts a woman holding a black cat on her arms. Van Dongen uses complementary colors of red and green for shocking effect. The painting was purchased in 1961 by Margaret and Harry Lynde Bradley from Sammy Chalom Royale Décoration in Paris, France. Mrs. Bradley gifted the work to the Milwaukee Art Center in 1975. It is now part of the Mrs. Harry L. Bradley Collection at the Milwaukee Art Museum.

== Bibliography ==
- Kelly, Chelsea Emelie (December 5, 2010). "From the Collection: Kees van Dongen’s 'Woman with Cat'. Milwaukee Art Museum. Retrieved August 7, 2023.
- Thelen, Margaret (September 29, 2015). "Bradley Collection Celebrates 40th Anniversary!". Milwaukee Art Museum. Retrieved August 7, 2023.
