= The Little Mulatta =

Painting by Henri Matisse

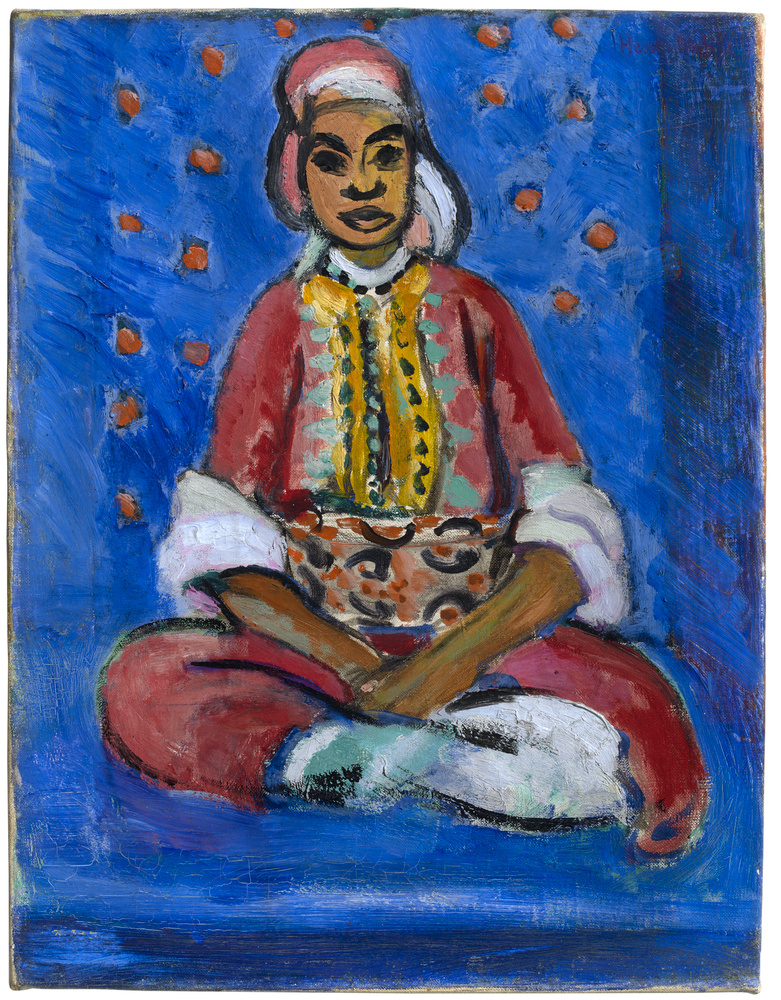

The Little Mulatta (French - La Petite Mulâtresse) or The Moroccan Girl (La Marocaine) is a 1912 oil on canvas painting by Henri Matisse, now in the Museum of Grenoble, to which it was left in the 1923 Agutte-Sembat legacy.

== See also ==
- List of works by Henri Matisse
