= Violon et Raisins =

1912 painting by Pablo Picasso

- Artist: Pablo Picasso
- Year: 1912
- Medium: Oil on canvas
- Dimensions: 61 cm × 50.8 cm (24 in × 20.0 in)
- Location: Museum of Modern Art; New York

Violon et Raisins (English: Violin and Grapes) is a 1912 oil on canvas painting by Pablo Picasso. This painting was one of five works exhibited by the artist at Galerie Goltz, Munich, along with Tête de femme. It is now in the Museum of Modern Art in New York City.
