= Woman with a Cat (Renoir) =

Painting by Pierre-Auguste Renoir

- Artist: Pierre-Auguste Renoir
- Year: 1875
- Medium: Oil on canvas
- Dimensions: 56 cm × 46.4 cm (22 in × 18.3 in)
- Location: National Gallery of Art

Woman with a Cat is an 1875 painting by the French artist Pierre-Auguste Renoir. It depicts a young woman sitting in a chair holding a cat. The work was gifted by Mr. and Mrs. Benjamin E. Levy to the National Gallery of Art in 1950.

== See also ==
- List of paintings by Pierre-Auguste Renoir

== Bibliography ==
- Rubin, James H. (2003). Impressionist Cats & Dogs: Pets in the Painting of Modern Life. Yale University Press. ISBN 9780300098730.OCLC 237841408.
