= View over the Bay of Tangier =

Painting by Matisse

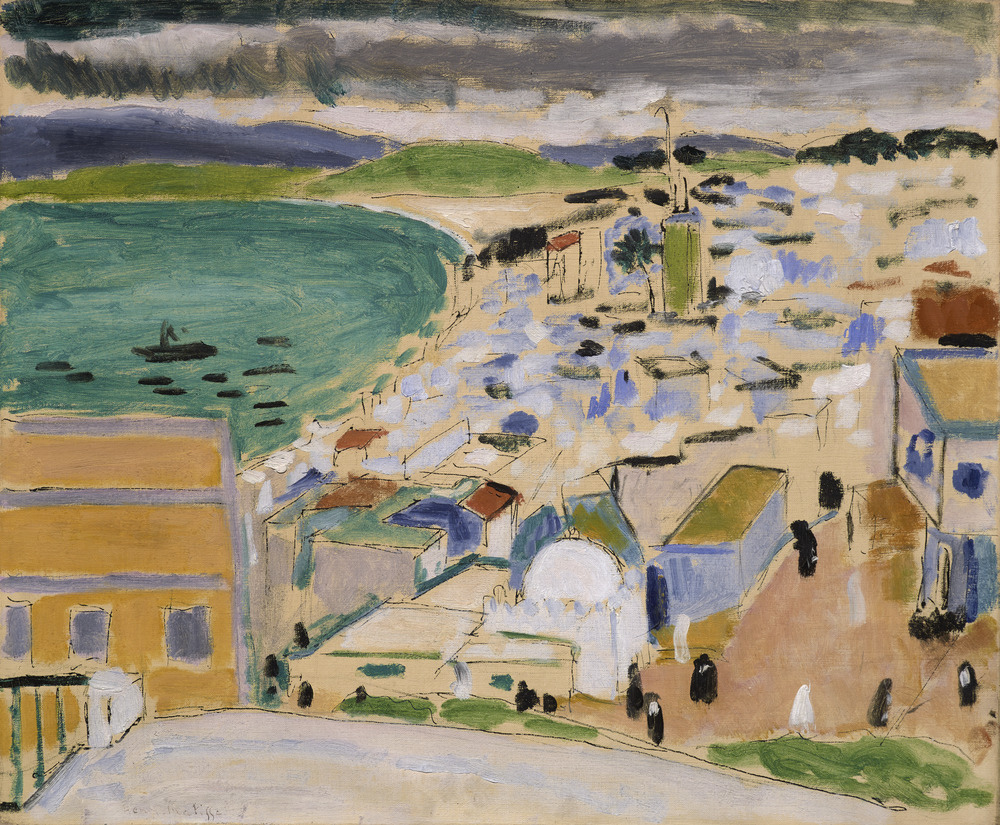

View over the Bay of Tangier is a 1912 oil on canvas painting by Henri Matisse, showing Tangier and its port on the Bay of Tangier. It was left to the Museum of Grenoble by Marcel Sembat and Georgette Agutte in 1923, and still hangs there.

== See also ==
- List of works by Henri Matisse
