= Paul Petard =

French botanist (1912–1980)

Paul Pétard (1912–1980) was a French botanist who specialized in the study of native plants of French Polynesia. His 1986 book Quelques plantes utiles de Polynésie française et Raau Tahiti is still widely used as a reference, and contains much information about traditional applications of Tahitian Noni juice. He held a doctorate in pharmacy.
