= HMS Petard =

Two ships of the Royal Navy have borne the name HMS Petard, after the petard, a type of bomb:

- HMS Petard (1916) was an Admiralty M-class destroyer launched in 1916 and sold in 1921.
- HMS Petard (G56) was a P-class destroyer launched in 1941. She was converted to a frigate in 1956 and was broken up in 1967.
