= Woman with a Cat (Bonnard) =

Painting by Pierre Bonnard

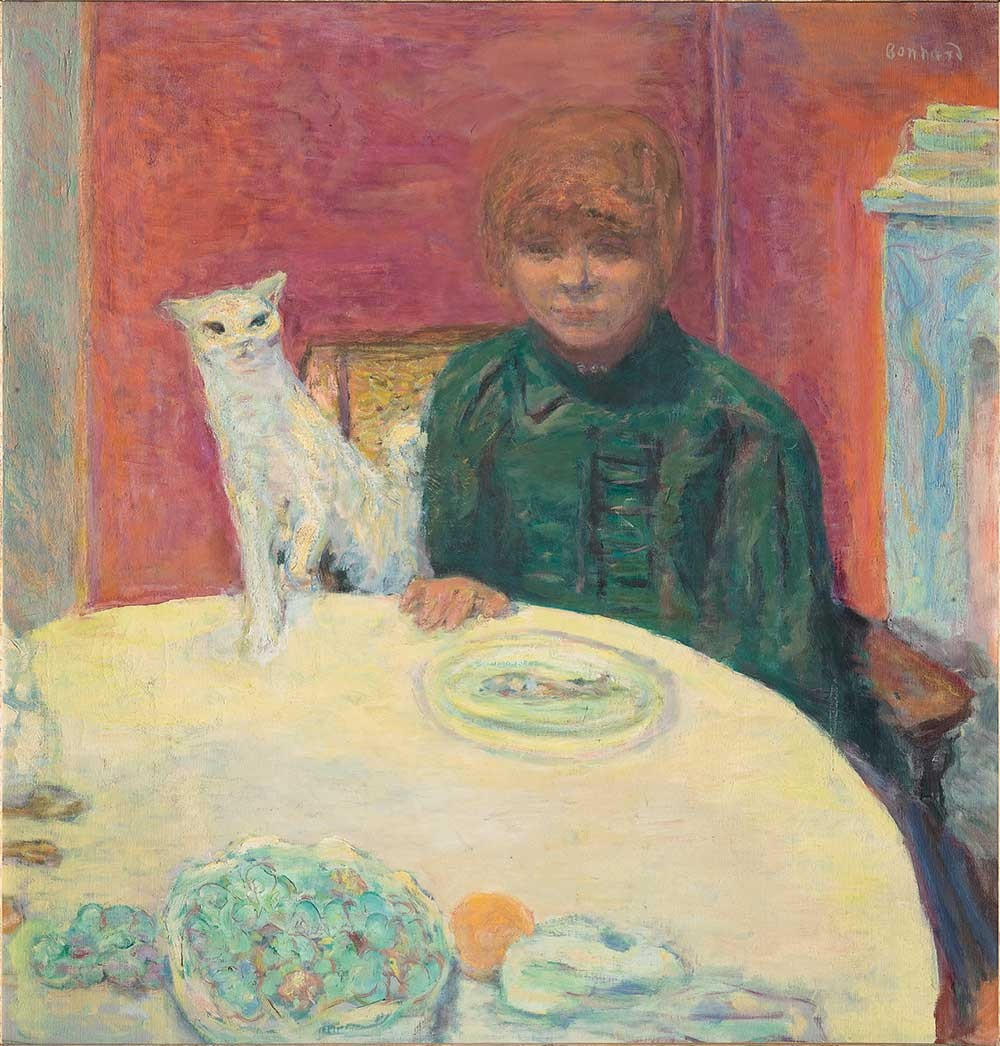
- Artist: Pierre Bonnard
- Year: 1912
- Medium: oil on canvas
- Dimensions: 78 cm × 77.5 cm (31 in × 30.5 in)
- Location: Musée d'Orsay, Paris

Woman with a Cat or The Demanding Cat (French: La Femme au chat) is a 1912 oil on canvas painting by French Post-Impressionist painter Pierre Bonnard (1867–1947). The work depicts Marthe Bonnard and a cat climbing on to a table arranged for a meal. The influence of Japanese prints is apparent, as it often is in works by Bonnard and the other artists of the Nabis. The painting was donated by Baronnes Eva Gebhard-Gourgaud to the Musée National d'Art Moderne in 1965, and assigned to the Musée d'Orsay in 1977.

== Bibliography ==
- Guide to the Musee d'Orsay. Ministére de la Culture et de la Communication. Editions de la Réunion des musées nationaux. 1987. p. 248. ISBN 2711821234
