= Gérard Albouy =

French milliner

Gerard Albouy
- Born: 1912
- Died: 1985 (aged 72–73)
- Occupation: Milliner

Gérard Albouy (1912–1985), often known by the name Ouy, was a French milliner. Between 1938 and 1964, he operated a Parisian hat shop called Albouy that was known for its decorative, baroque-style hats. Notable works include veiled hats made of recycled newspaper, which he constructed during the German occupation of France, and the mollusque, a hat made without interlining. Albouy's hobbies included painting and collecting art.
