= Félicien Rops =

19th-century Belgian artist

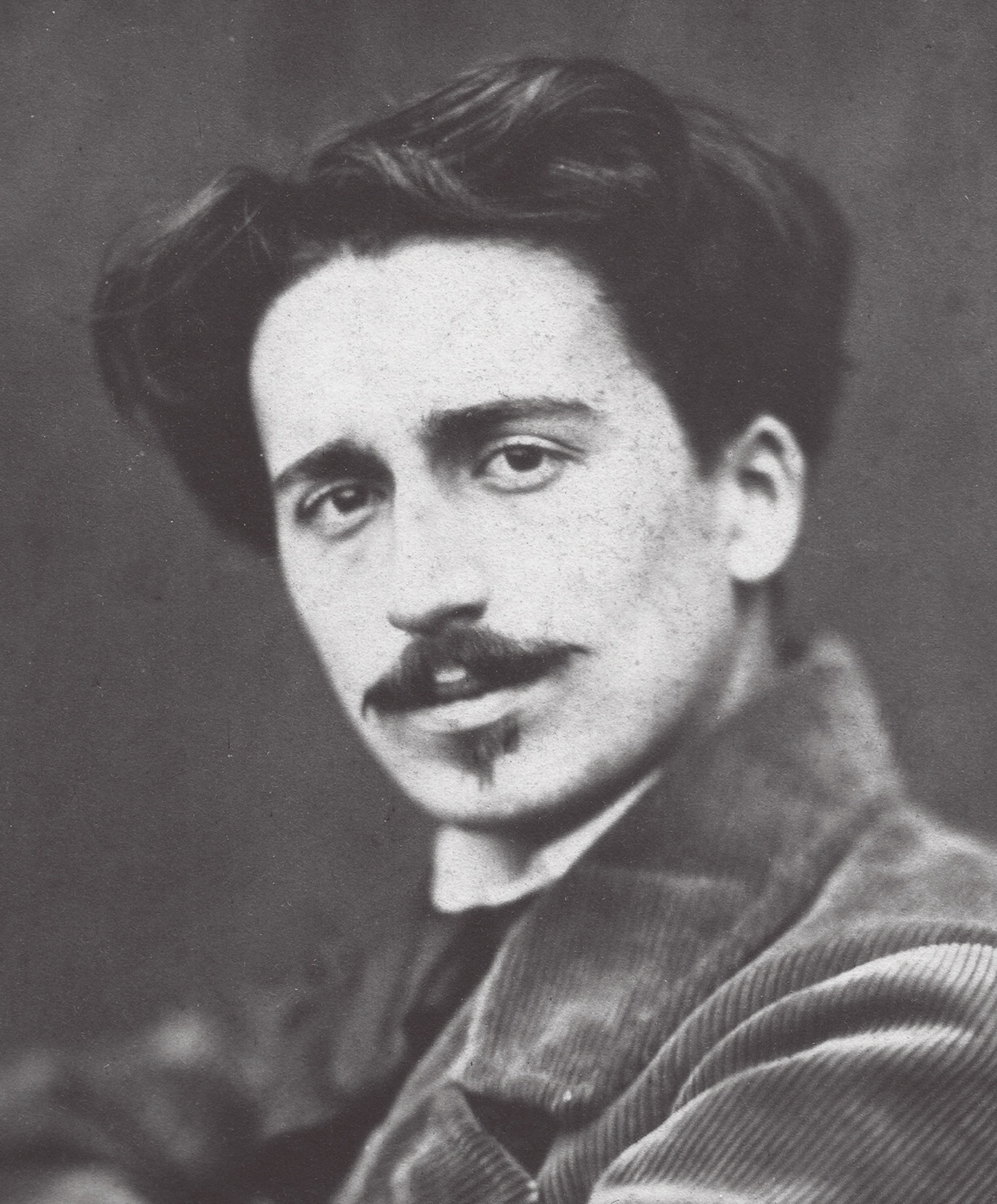
- Rops c. 1860
- Born: 7 July 1833; Namur, Belgium
- Died: 23 August 1898 (aged 65); Essonnes, France
- Known for: Print making, intaglio, illustrations, drawing, painting
- Notable work: Pornocrates, Les Sataniques, Les Diaboliques
- Movement: Symbolism, Decadent movement, Fin de siècle

Félicien Victor Joseph Rops (French: [felisjɛ̃ viktɔʁ ʒozɛf ʁɔps]; 7 July 1833 – 23 August 1898) was a Belgian artist associated with Symbolism, Decadence and the Parisian fin de siècle, and was a member of the Les XX group. He was a painter, illustrator, caricaturist and a prolific and innovative print maker, particularly in intaglio (etching and aquatint). Although not well known to the general public and initially sought after as a pornographer, Rops was greatly respected by his bohemian peers and actively pursued and celebrated as an illustrator by the publishers, authors, and poets of his time. He provided frontispieces and illustrations for works by Jules Barbey d'Aurevilly, Charles Baudelaire, Charles De Coster, Théophile Gautier, Joris-Karl Huysmans, Stéphane Mallarmé, Joséphin Péladan, Paul Verlaine, Voltaire and many others. Best known today for his prints and drawings illustrating erotic and occult literature of the period, he also produced oil paintings including landscapes, seascapes and occasional genre paintings. Rops is recognized as a pioneer of Belgian comics.

== Biography ==
=== Childhood and education (1833–1857) ===
Rops was born 7 July 1833 in Namur, Belgium, the only child of Sophie Maubile and Nicholas Rops. The Rops were a well-off bourgeois family, their wealth coming from textile manufacturing. Félicien was educated at his home by private tutors until the age of ten; then in 1843, he enrolled in a local Jesuit school for the next five years. His ability to recite lengthy passages from the Bible in Latin attest to both a good education and his intelligence, although even as a schoolboy it is reported that he had "begun to let fantasy dominate his thinking" and received complaints about "his passion for producing uninhibited caricatures of his teachers". Nicholas Rops died in 1849. After some disagreements between Rops and his mother over the direction of his future education, a compromise was reached, and in June 1849 he enrolled at the Athénée secondary school in Namur while simultaneously attending the Academy of Fine Arts there.

In 1851, Rops moved to Brussels and began studying law at the University of Brussels. However, by 1853, he was attending the Académie de Saint-Luc where he studied drawing and developed his skill as a draughtsman working from live models, meeting others like Louis Artan, Constantin Meunier, and Charles de Groux, and taking part in the local bohemian milieu. It was at this time that he began contributing caricatures, cartoons, and satirical lithographs to student magazines, in particular Le Crocodile which brought him some notoriety. In 1856, Rops, along with Victor Hallaux (pseudonym Victor de la Hesbaye) and Charles De Coster progressed from student magazines to founding their own journal, The Uylenspiegel, a weekly artistic and literary satirical review to which he contributed one or two lithographs an issue, more than 180 total, furthering his reputation.

=== Early career in Belgium, and marriage (1857–1870) ===
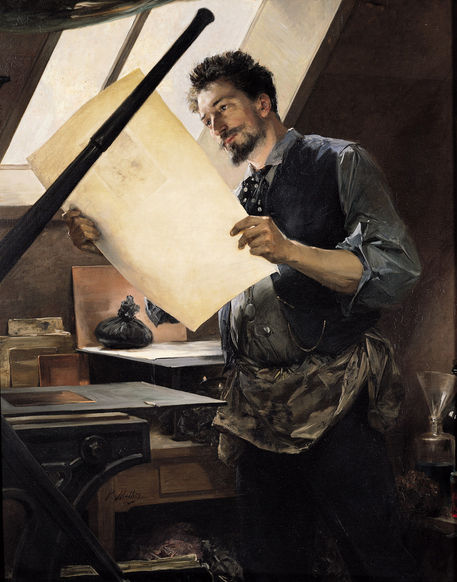
Felicien Rops in his Studio by Paul Mathey

In June 1857, Rops married Charlotte Polet de Faveaux, the daughter of a wealthy magistrate and owner of Thozée Castle (see external links below) in the countryside near the town of Mettet, Belgium. For the first few years at Thozée, Rops enjoyed a comfortable life of a country gentleman, pursuing passions for painting, botany, and even founding a rowing club in 1862, the Royal Nautical Club of Sambre and Meuse. He spoke highly of his father-in-law in his letters. Rops and his wife had a son, Paul, in 1858, and a daughter, Juliet, in 1859, who died at the age of five. Rops relinquished his managerial role at Uylenspiegel but continued contributing cartoons and illustrations until 1862. He began to explore etching and produced political lithographs, occasional caricatures and cartoons for magazines, and frontispieces and illustrations for books. He illustrated a number of De Coster's books including Légendes Flamandes (1858), Contes Brabançons (1861) and La Légende d'Uylenspiegel ('Tijl Uilenspiegel', 1867). His home became a gathering place for artists, writers, publishers and friends. The Société Libre des Beaux-Arts (Free Society of Fine Arts) in Brussels was founded in 1868 and Rops served as vice-president for several years. By the 1860s, Rops was traveling extensively and dividing his time between Thozée Castle, Namur, Brussels, and Paris each year; with ever extending time in Paris at the center of the art and literary world, and ever decreasing time at Thozée Castle and Namur with his wife and family as the decade passed.

In 1862, he studied etching with Félix Bracquemond and Jules Ferdinand Jacquemart in Paris and he became a restless experimenter with etching techniques. In later years, with his friend Armand Rassenfosse they developed a new soft ground varnish method which was dubbed "Ropsenfosse". His activity as a lithographer had ceased by 1865, and although he continued oil painting, etching became his principal medium. He produced 34 frontispieces for books published between 1864 and 1870 and founded the short-lived International Society of Etchers (1869–1871).

=== Relationship with Charles Baudelaire (1862–1867) ===
Baudelaire wrote the following tribute to Rops:

Use all your eloquence..../ To say how much I like / That bizarre Mr. Rops / Who may not be a Rome First Prize / But whose talent is as great / As the pyramids of Cheops.

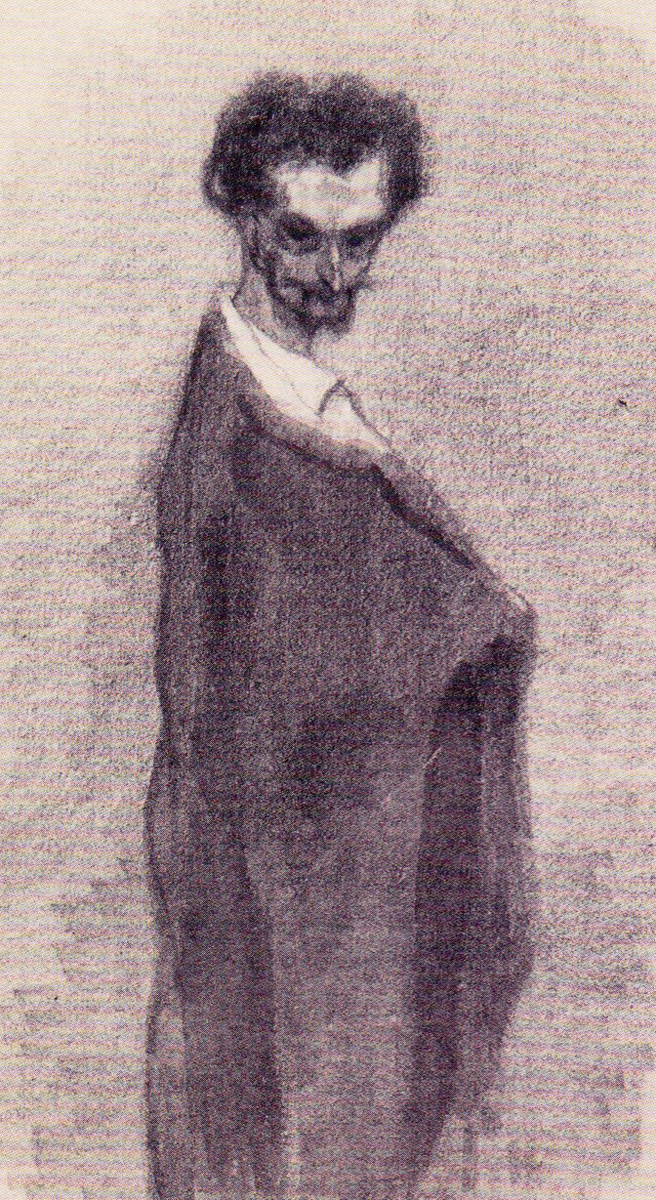
A self-portrait in crayon and ink from the 1860s (detail)

Rops created the frontispiece for Baudelaire's Les Épaves (The Wreckage) and a selection of poems from Les Fleurs du mal (The Flowers of Evil) that had been censored in France, and were therefore published in Belgium. Rops first met Baudelaire's publisher Auguste Poulet-Malassis in 1862 and was later introduced to Charles Baudelaire towards the end of the poet's life. A friendship developed and Baudelaire visited the Rops family at Thozée Castle on many occasions and they traveled together on at least one occasion. In a letter (25 August 1886) discussing Baudelaire's writing, Rops wrote: "I lived with Baudelaire for two years. and often served him as a secretary, I never once saw him consult a dictionary. He didn't have any, and didn't want to have any...saying 'A man who looks up a word in a dictionary is like a conscript who, upon receiving the order to fire, looks for a cartridge in his pouch.'" In a letter to Édouard Manet (11 May 1865) Baudelaire wrote, "Rops is the only true artist (in the sense in which I, and perhaps I alone, understand the word artist), that I have found in Belgium." By 1866 Baudelaire and Poulet-Malassis were both in Belgium, in self-imposed exile evading creditors. Baudelaire stated that Rops and Poulet-Malassis were the only persons who "lightened [his] sadness in Belgium".

It was while visiting Namur, in March 1866, that Baudelaire's first symptoms of aphasia and hemiplegia became apparent. Rops invited Baudelaire and Poulet-Malassis to visit his hometown, where Baudelaire had seen and admired the baroque Church of Saint-Loup at Namur (see external links below) before, calling it "the masterpiece of Jesuit masterpieces" and stating the stained-glass windows illuminated the interior like a "terrible and delightful catafalque". Baudelaire collapsed on the floor while they were admiring the carving on the confessionals there. Baudelaire never fully recovered and died in August 1867 at the age of 46.

Baudelaire left an impression upon Rops that lasted until the end of his life. His association with Baudelaire and his illustrations of his poetry helped increase the visibility of his work and win the admiration of many other artists and writers, including Théophile Gautier, Stéphane Mallarmé, Jules Barbey d'Aurevilly, Joséphin Péladan, Puvis de Chavannes, Gustave Moreau, and Edmond and Jules de Goncourt. By 1870 Rops had made many friends and was living in Paris most of the year and immersed at the heart of literary Paris and the Symbolist and Decadent movements. Taking his cue from Baudelaire's "The Painter of Modern Life", he "cultivated the airs of a dandy". Félix Fénéon was to write of him "Rops: Anoints himself with rouge, dyes his hair and wears a blood-red shirt: looks, or so he hopes, like a sarcastic Satan."

=== Later career in Paris (1871–1898) ===
The extended months in Paris away from his wife, and his poorly concealed extramarital affairs (described by his biographer Patrick Bade as his "careless contempt for bourgeois family values") took a toll on Rops's marriage by the early 1870s. His wife Charlotte wrote to him in a letter: "Your latest despicable affair, the eighth since I met you and we were married, was your way of punishing others, you killed me! Since you don't want to see me any more and asked me not to write to you any more, I want my last word to you to be a word of pardon". One of his mistresses—Alice Renaud, the woman referred to in his wife's letter—was murdered by her jealous husband a few years later, and Rops was involved in the scandal when his intimate love letters to her were read out loud at her husband's trial. Although they never divorced, by 1875 Félicien and Charlotte were permanently estranged and Paris was to be his home for the remainder of his life.

However, far from being disheartened, he thrived among the Parisian artists and poets and his critical reputation grew. There was a greater demand than ever for his illustrations in the last quarter of the 19th century by the publishers and authors of the literary vanguard. Rops was prolific and achieved financial success, boasting in 1877 that "he was the best-paid illustrator in France." He traveled extensively throughout Europe, ranging from the capital cities and art centers, to salmon fishing in Norway and Sweden, back country ventures in Hungary, as well as Spain and Northern Africa. Rops frequently exhibited at the various salons in Paris where the public was both fascinated and shocked by his art and his personal life.

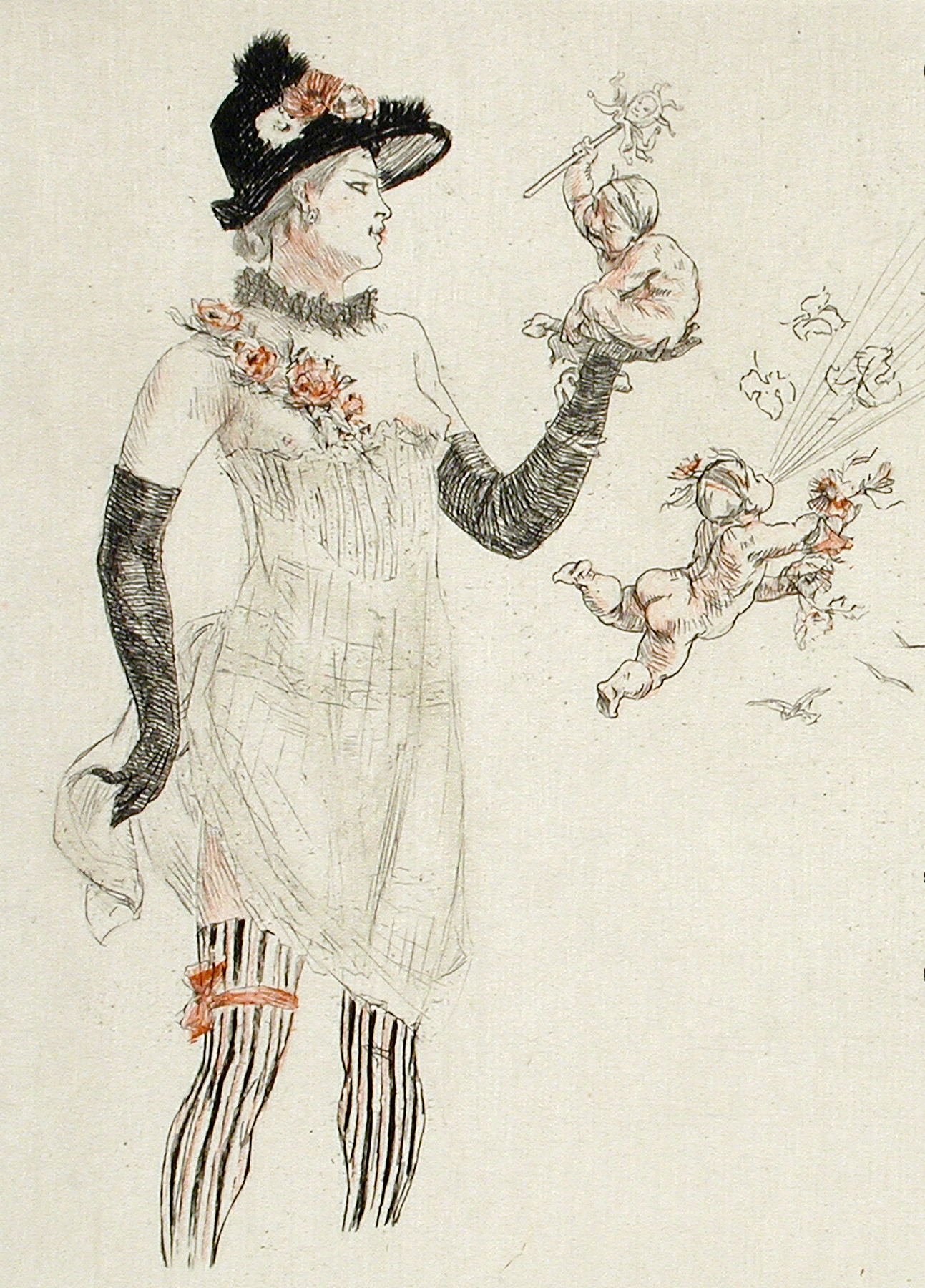
J.-K. Huysmans identified "Mlle. Duluc" as the model in this etching.

In the 1860s Rops had developed an acquaintance with a Madame Duluc and her two young daughters, Aurélie and Léontine Duluc (age 14 and 17 respectively at that time). A few years later, not long before the estrangement from his wife, he began a ménage à trois with the sisters, apparently with their mother's endorsement. He had children with both, although one child died at an early age; the other, Claire, daughter of Léontine Duluc born in 1871, went on to marry the Belgian author Eugène Demolder. The Duluc sisters ran Maison Duluc, a successful fashion house in Paris, for which Rops designed logos and provided advertisements. The three traveled together to the United States and Canada on two occasions to present their fashions. At least one of the sisters served as a model on occasion, and one example was the figure illustrated in Georges Camuset's Sonnet du Docteur (The Sonnets of the Doctor; 1884). The three lived together for over 25 years until Rops's death. They ultimately settled in La Demi-Lune, a house he purchased, on the River Seine in Corbeil-Essonnes south of Paris, where Rops continued his passion for botany and developed new varieties of roses in later years. Aurélie and Léontine often combined their names, signing Auréléon in their letters and correspondence with Rops.

Rops was invited to join Les XX or Les Vingt, a group of Belgian artists formed in 1883 which held annual exhibitions and concerts at the Palais des Beaux-Arts and the Museum of Modern Art of Brussels. Founders of the Les Vingt included James Ensor, Théo van Rysselberghe, and Fernand Khnopff among others and were later joined by Anna Boch, Jan Toorop, Odilon Redon, and Paul Signac. Their intention was to protect "true originality" and provide a place "where people are free, not only in fact but above all in thought." For 10 years Les Vingt championed the work of progressive artists and composers of the time including many of the Impressionists, Post-Impressionists, Pointillists, and Symbolists. The French poet Stéphane Mallarmé held Tuesday evening discussions on the arts and literature at his home on 87 Rue de Rome in Paris. These talks became a place of pilgrimage attended by dozens of writers and artists of the time including Rops, Paul Gauguin, J.-K. Huysmans, Édouard Manet, Edvard Munch, Odilon Redon, Paul-Marie Verlaine, and Emile Zola. He maintained his literary associations to the end of his life and in 1896 the literary revue "La Plume" published a special edition tribute volume devoted exclusively to Rops where many of the prominent authors and artists such as Puvis de Chavannes, Joris-Karl Huysmans, Octave Mirbeau, Josephin Peladan, and Jose-Maria De Heredia praised and celebrated his work. Félicien Rops was a freemason and a member of the Grand Orient of Belgium.

Due to an accident with "bichlorate of potassium" in 1892, Rops almost lost his eyesight but he eventually recovered. With his health slowly deteriorating and anticipating legal challenges from his estranged wife Charlotte, his son Paul, and father-in-law, a judge in Belgium, he made a will in July 1896 leaving everything to the Duluc sisters. He spent some time in the south of France with its milder climate on a doctor's orders but it provided only a little relief. In time, legal issues did arise and the Duluc sisters successfully disputed Paul's attempts to have his father removed from their care, but compromise settlements were made on other issues. Rops died on 23 August 1898 at his home, with Aurélie and Léontine Duluc, his daughter Claire, and some close friends at his side. When notified of his imminent death, Paul traveled from Belgium, but arrived too late to see his father alive. Rops was buried in Essonnes but his body was moved to the family burial grounds in Namur, Belgium eight years later. The following year, he was posthumously awarded the Legion of Honour.

There is now a Museum, Musée Félicien Rops, in his home town of Namur, Belgium, housing approximately 3,000 engravings and 500 drawings and paintings. Rops also was a gifted and prolific writer of letters, most of which are located at KBR. Referring to Rops, Edgar Degas told Manet "That one writes even better than he engraves [...]. If they ever publish his correspondence, I'll sign up for a thousand copies of propaganda" The Félicien Rops Museum has documented and indexed over 4,000 letters so far, over half are currently available online (see External Links below). His correspondences serve as valuable documents and references, not only for Rops and his work, but for the numerous artists, writers, publishers, and other notable culture figures of late 19th-century Europe. The biographers of Baudelaire have drawn from Rops's letters extensively (e.g.).

== Art ==
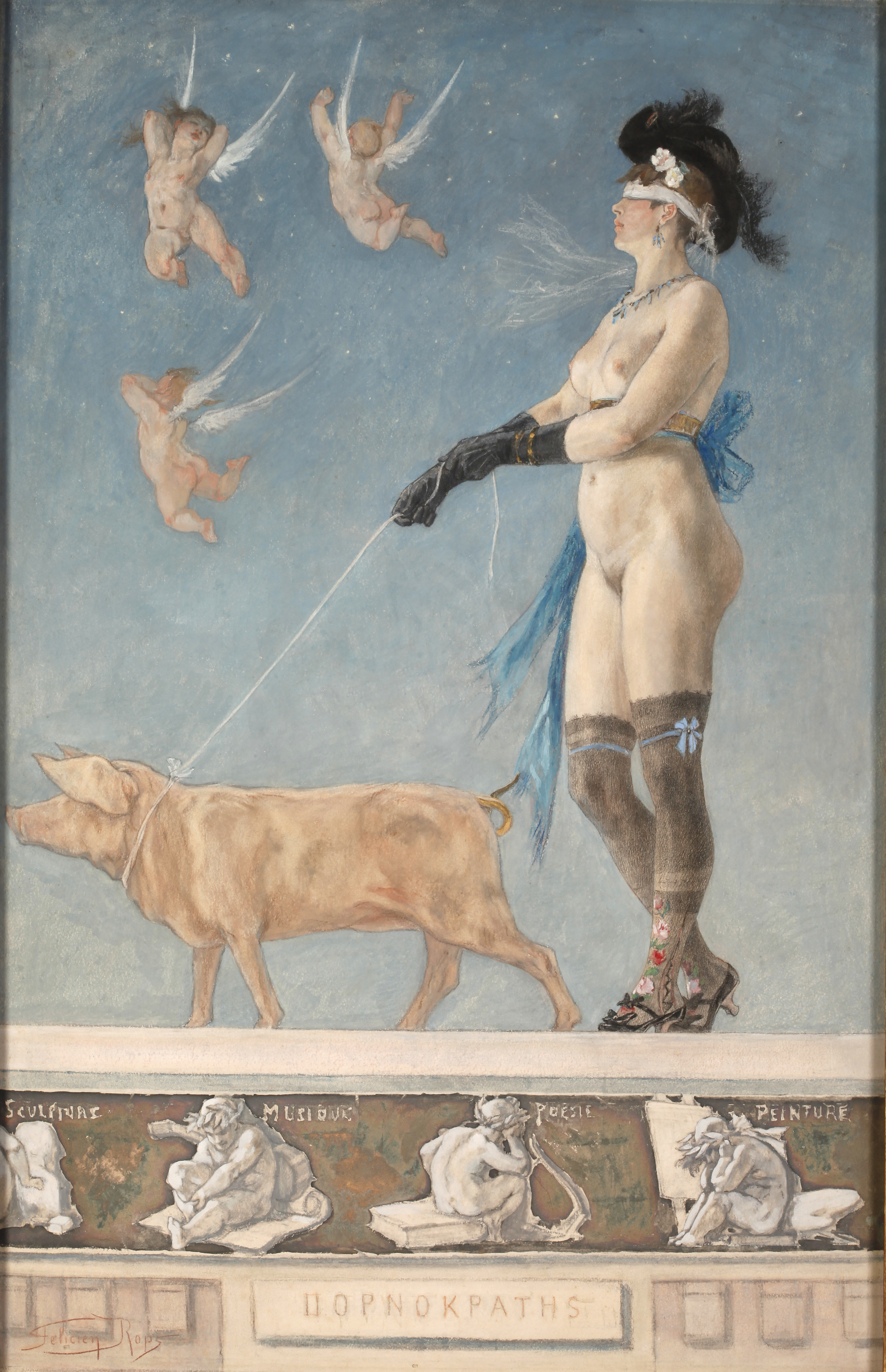
Pornocrates (1878) watercolor, gouache, and pastel (75 x 48 cm.) Musée Félicien Rops, Namur, Belgium

Art historians do not consider Rops a seminal figure of late 19th-century art, even among the symbolists, and yet no creditable review of symbolism could ignore him either. The French symbolist writers are known to have taken a special interest in his production. He is "the graphic artist most directly identified with Decadence", to the point of having been known in Russian white émigré circles as the "Ur-decadent" painter, but John Robert Reed's monograph Decadent Style (1985) argues that he depicted decadent themes without embracing the Decadent form of art. Rops achieved the reputation of a pornographer early on in his career, with his work featured prominently and his name advertised on the frontispiece of the British Victorian era pornography collector Henry Spencer Ashbee's Index Librorum Prohibitorum (1877). Some of his critics dismiss him as a novel, 19th-century illustrator/pornographer, but others look beyond the erotica and write of him respectfully and favorably. He was regarded as the greatest Belgian artist of his time by Baudelaire (an influential art critic as well as a poet). Jean-Luc Daval spoke of "the amazing upsurge of Symbolism that in the wake of Félicien Rops and under the influence of Gustave Moreau, characterized Belgian painting at the turn of the century." According to Edith Hoffmann, the "erotic or frankly pornographic" nature of much of Rops's work "is at least partly due to the attraction these subjects had for a provincial artist who never forgot his first impressions of Paris". In contrast to Hoffmann's "provincial artist", Octave Mirbeau wrote "Painter, man of letters, philosopher, scholar, Rops was all of that."

Félicien Rops was a prolific and versatile artist. In addition to works of fine art depicting genre subjects, still-life, landscapes, decadent nightlife, eroticism, and iconic symbolist works like Pornocrates, he produced hundreds of comics, caricatures, book illustrations, and even an occasional advertisement. His style could sway from realism, to symbolism, and at times even touch on romanticism and impressionism. His images can be pastoral (e.g. The Rocks of the Grands Malades) or urban (e.g. Sailors Den); social and political critiques both sympathetic (e.g. Strike, The Charcoal) and caustic (e.g. Order Reigns in Warsaw); documentary (e.g. Head of Zealander) or fantasy (e.g. The Librarian); and range from poetic and metaphoric (e.g. The Lyre) to stark realism (e.g. Absinthe Drinker). Three etchings depicting animals illustrate a wide display of approaches in styles, techniques, and underlying connotations (see gallery II). Japanese Salamander and Beetle is loose in technique and a simple, decorative nature study, one of a few pastiches Rops made of Japanese woodblock printing that were popular and influential among European artists in the late 19th century. The Cat, executed in an illustrative, near academic style, presents a pleasant likeness of a cat, yet embroidered on the chair is the phrase "Amica Non Serva" [Friend Not Servant], endowing this unassuming image with a declaration of sovereignty not immediately apparent to the casual viewer. Separated or Simian Spring uses an abrupt and serrated hatching technique to convey primitive, psycho-sexual undertones that anticipates expressionism in the early 20th century.

French art critic and historian Jean Cassou posited three distinct periods in Rops's artistic life: romantic 1855–1860; symbolist 1860–1870; realist 1871–1898. While these dates are not supported by others, and are contrary to even the most cursory examination of the work [e.g., symbolist works such as Pornocrates (1878); Les Sataniques (1882); The Lyre frontispiece for Poésies by Mallarmé (1895); and Parallelism, the frontispiece for Chair [Flesh] by Verlaine (1896) were produced in Cassou's posited "realist 1871–1898" period], Cassou's association of Rops with realism is valid and important in understanding his work. Whether drawing genre subjects or decadent Parisian nightlife, Rops produced realist images throughout his artistic life and they constitute a significant part of his oeuvre. This aspect of his work is often marginalized or ignored by authors who are preoccupied with his erotic and satanic images (enthusiastically or negatively).

Working in a long and rich tradition of Franco-Flemish realist-genre painting (e.g., the Le Nain Brothers, Adriaen Brouwer) but also showing an awareness and influence of contemporaries like Honoré Daumier, Jean-François Millet, and Gustave Courbet, Rops was attracted to genre subjects throughout his life. Although represented in any number of media, they most often appear in his drawings and etchings. The rural and working people of Wallonia were frequent subjects, typically treated in a simple and sympathetic manner, as in The Kitchen of the Artists' Inn, in Anseremme. The elderly appear again and again in works such as Old Kate. Rops also often drew and etched people he encountered in his travels who were dressed in ethnic and regional clothing and costumes, often in a rather documentary style. Two examples include A Shaker Pianist and Head of Zealander: others are La Dalécarlienne (1874), Le Moujick (1874), and In the Pusta (1879). Rops once wrote he had "the desire to depict the scenes and characters of the 19th century that I find so fascinating and curious" and pieces like Sailors Den, Cherub's Song, and The Absinthe Drinker can be viewed as works of realism just as they can be seen as works of the decadent movement.

Rops once wrote: "The love of brutal pleasures, the pre-occupation with money, and mean interests have glued onto the faces of most of our contemporaries, a sinister mask in which the perverse instinct mentioned by Edgar Allan Poe can be read in capital letters: all of this seems to me sufficiently amusing and characteristic that well-meaning artists should attempt to render the look of their time".

He was credited by Joris-Karl Huysmans with reclaiming lust for the visual arts and placing it centre-stage. Huysmans noted the religious motivation of Rops's art, "not ... obscene and practical ... but ... Catholic, flaming and terrible". Charles Brison observed that "Rops never shed his Catholic sense of sin and the accompanying need for forgiveness". To Reed, "[Rops's] satanism was a protest, suggesting a craving not unlike Huysmans's for the fierce commitments of the Middle Ages". Stanisław Przybyszewski, who drew from Rops's outlook on women along with his follower, the painter Wojciech Weiss, traced Rops's depictions of lust to the witchhunters Jean Bodin and Pierre de Lancre. Rops's prostitution-themed artwork, in particular The Human Parody (1878–1881), fits into an iconographic tradition reaching as far back as the fifteenth century.

Huysmans highlighted Rops's use of woman as a symbol for moralistic social critique – a dehumanising device that Reed argues has the opposite effect to the Decadent concern with the decorative. Rops associated woman with death, materialism and a pursuit of pleasure that represented "a perversion of the higher craving for an impossible ideal". His portrayal of female figures has been placed in the context of turn-of-the-century concerns with female vampirism. Pornocrates mockingly proposes a "triumph of lechery over romantic love" as the outcome of the contemporary women's movement.

According to H. R. Blakeley, "scholarship about Rops disproportionately fixates on the erotic aspects of his art, reductively classifying him as perversely misogynistic instead of investigating the complexities of his relationships with and attitudes about women."

=== Painting and drawing ===
Rops's oil paintings are varied in subject and style. They include still life paintings, street scenes such as Entrance to the Ball, the Symbolist Death at the Ball, and many landscapes. He painted landscapes throughout his career, often small canvases done in En plein air. Examples like The Rocks of the Grands Malades and Snow in Thozée were painted in the vicinity of his hometown Namur, in Wallonia (Belgium). The influences of Jean-Baptiste-Camille Corot, Gustave Courbet, and the Barbizon School can be detected in many of his landscapes. Living in Paris and exhibiting with Les XX, Rops had ample opportunity to meet artists and absorb the work of the schools and movements of the day, and elements of Impressionism are evident in The Beach in Heist, painted on the Belgian coast.

A small series of variations on a theme, The Lady with the Puppet includes four drawings with mixed media (watercolor, color pencil, pastel etc.) that were executed between 1873 and 1890. These symbolist works each show a woman, a "simple tart", playing with a puppet (an allegory of man). In one, the woman unassumingly holds a blood-smeared trailing point at her side, with which she has slit the belly of the puppet open, and amusingly holds the puppet high as gold coins drain from his limp body.

About 1878–1881 Rops produced a large series of over 100 pieces he called Cent légers croquis pour réjouir les honnêtes gens (A hundred lighthearted sketches without pretension to delight honest people) for a Parisian bibliophile, Jules Noilly. These were made in a variety of mixed media, mostly works on paper, including drawing, color pencil, watercolor, gouache, and pastel. Examples from the series include The Human Parody, The Librarian, L'Amour Mouché, Venus and Cupid-Love blowing his nose, and Cherub's Song.

==== Gallery I: paintings and drawings ====
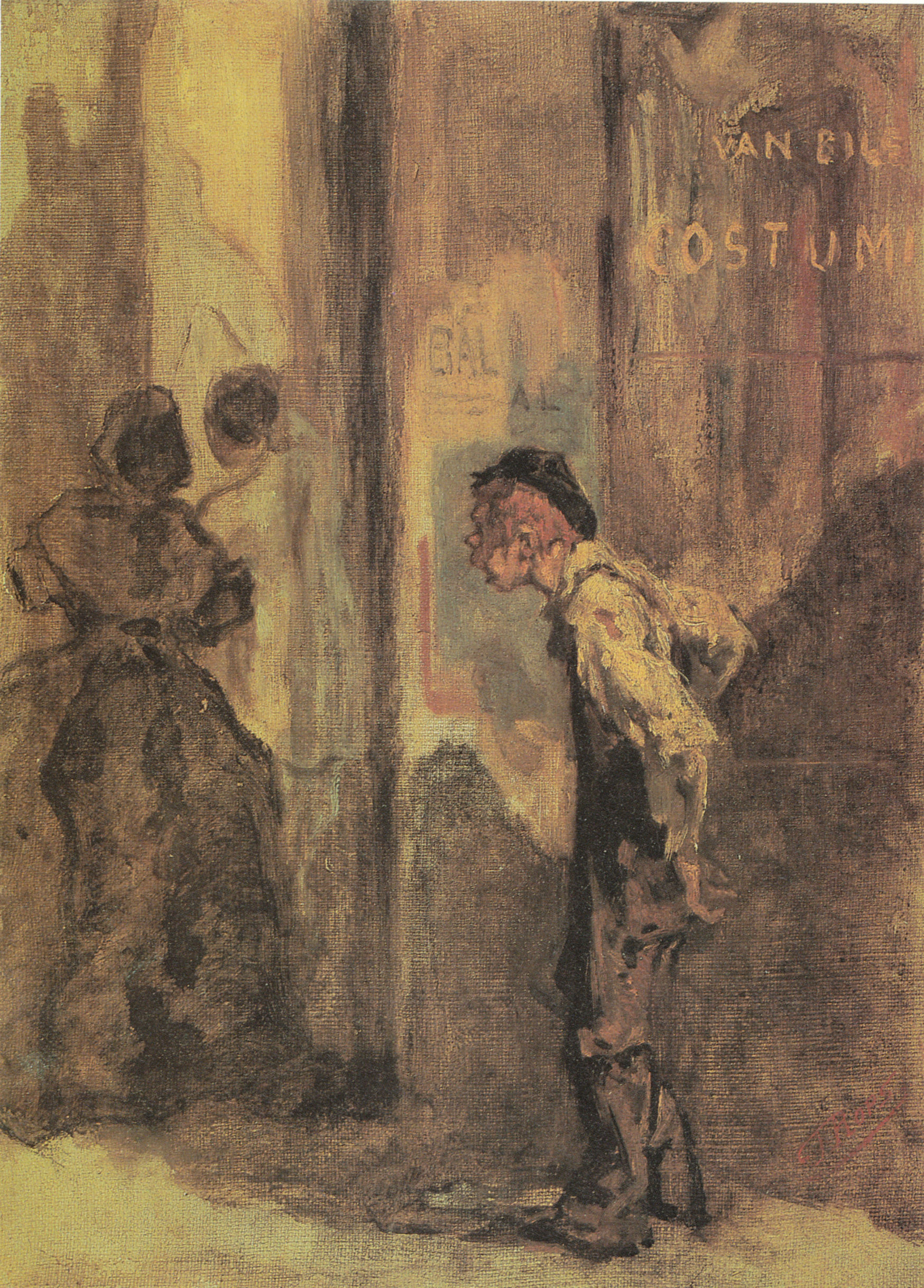
Entrance to the Ball (ca. 1858) Oil on canvas, mounted on board (29.5 x 21 cm) Musée Félicien Rops, Namur, Belgium

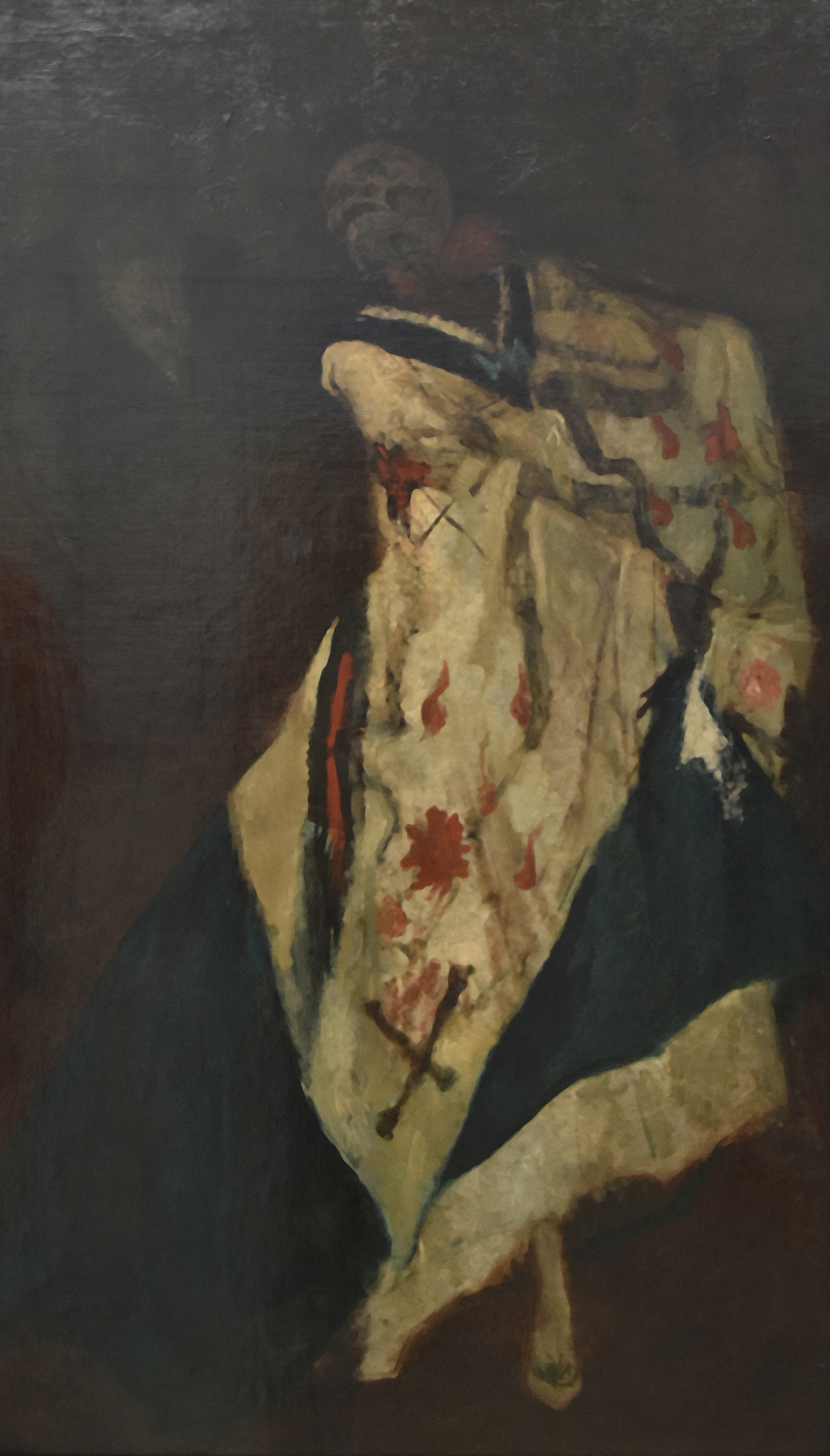
Death at the Ball (ca. 1865–1875) oil on canvas (150 x 85 cm) Kröller-Müller Museum, Netherlands

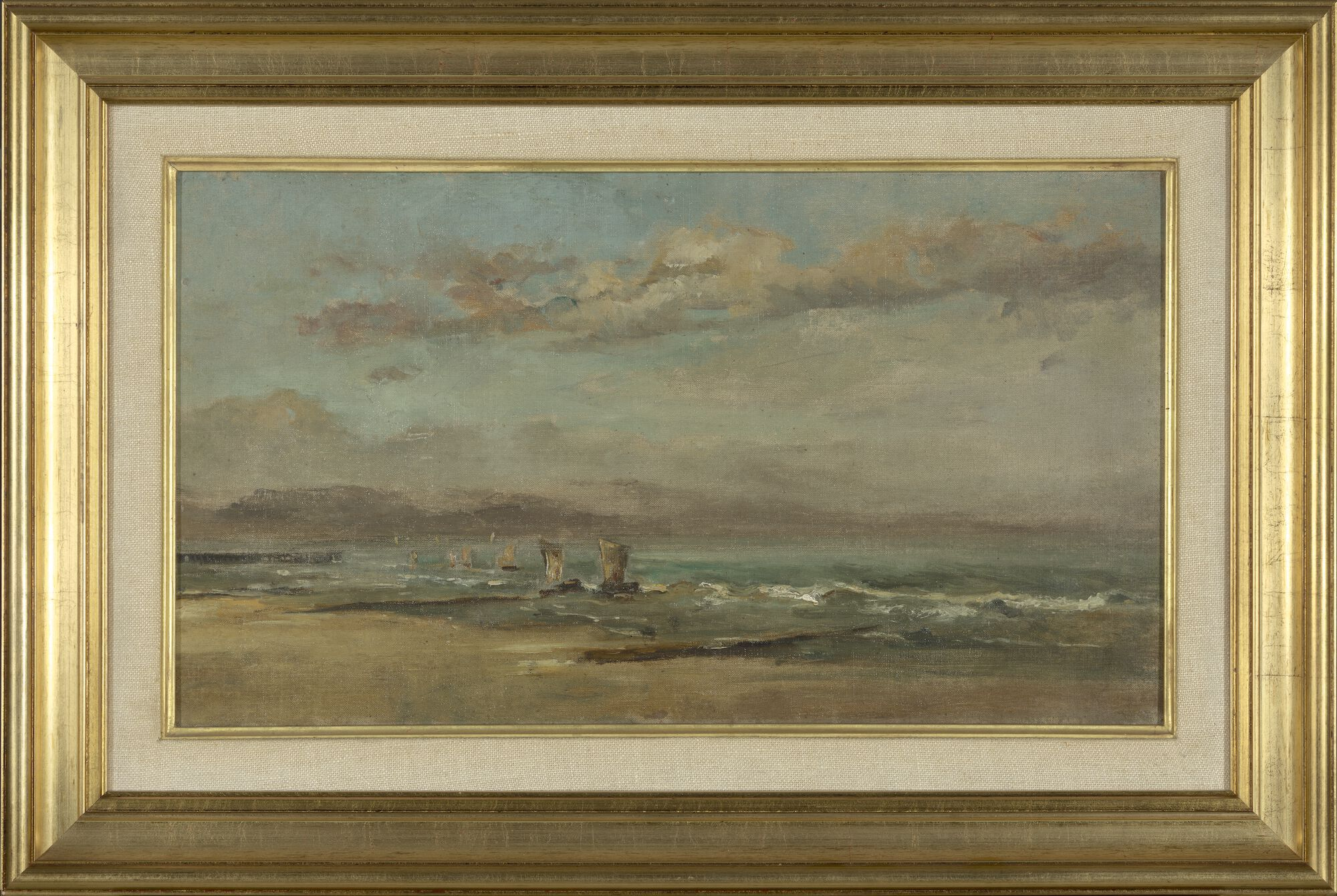
North Sea fishing boats (no date) NAVIGO National Fishing Museum, Koksijde

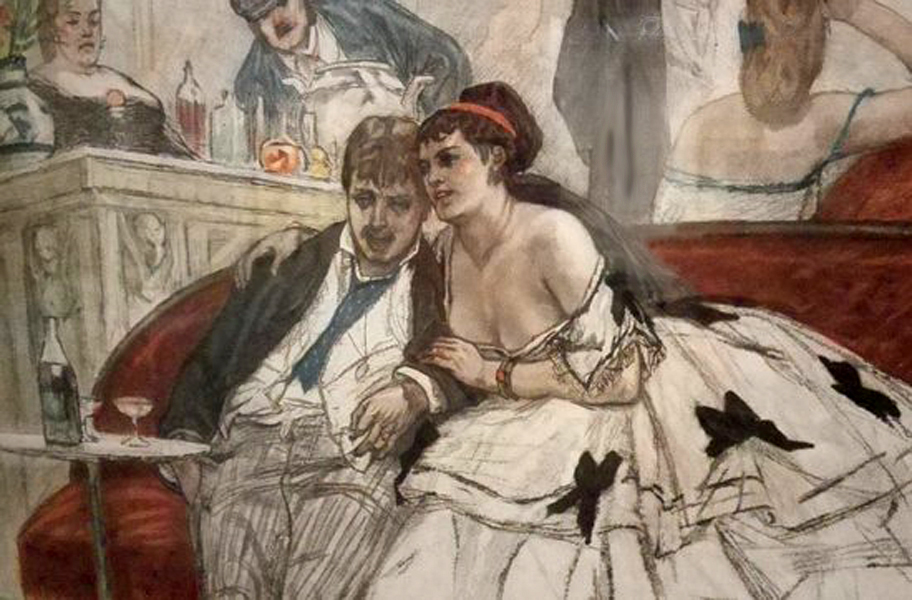
The Drunken Dandy (no date) mixed media on paper (39 x 48 cm) Musée Félicien Rops, Namur

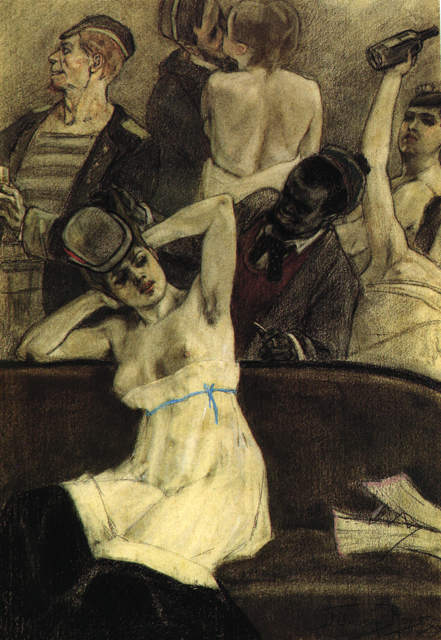
Sailors Den (1875) watercolor, pastel, gouache (60.5 x 46.5 cm) Musée Félicien Rops, Namur

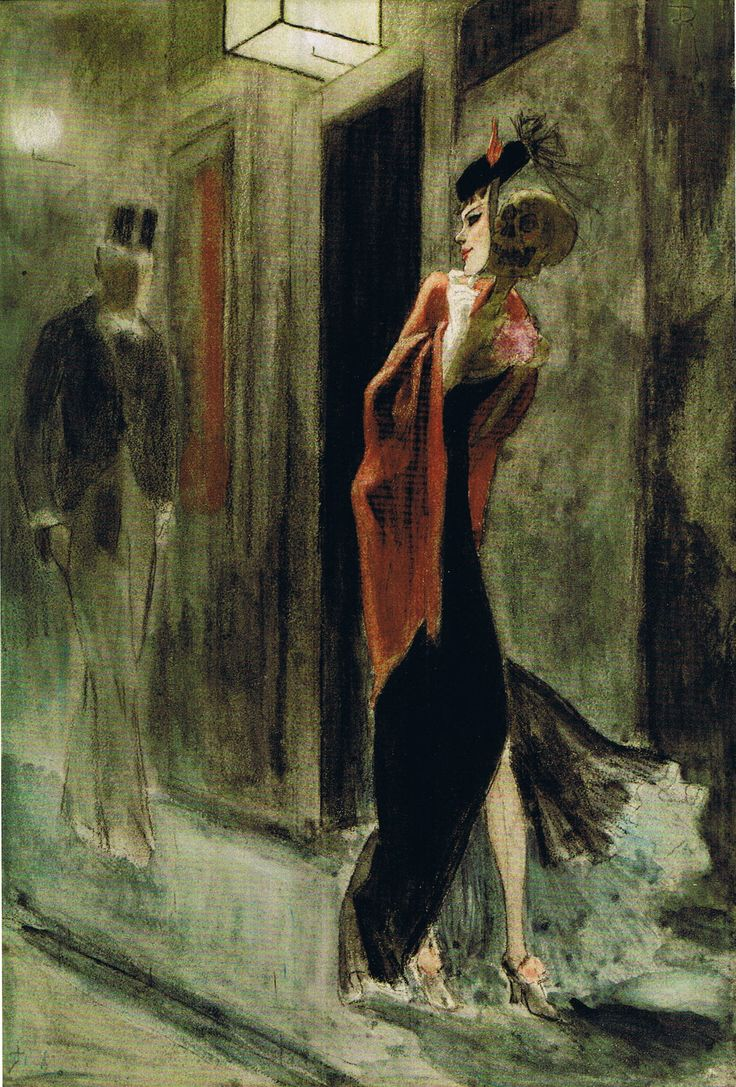
The Human Parody (1878–1881) watercolor, pastel, chalk (22.5 x 15 cm)

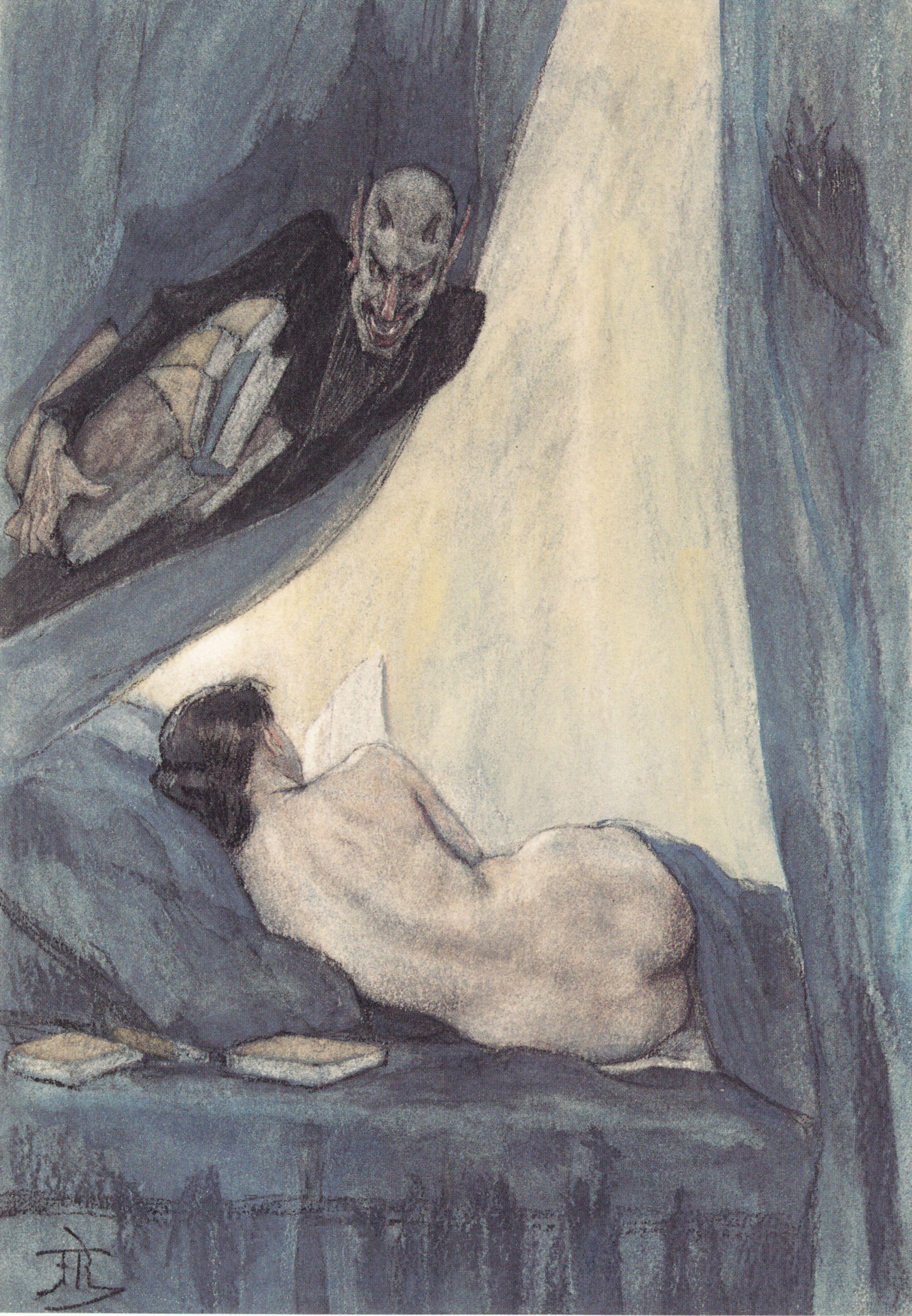
The Librarian, (1878–1881) pencil, watercolor, gouache (22 x 14.5 cm) Namur

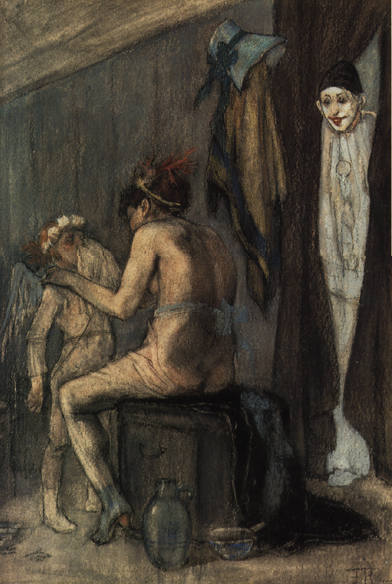
L'Amour Mouché, Venus and Cupid-Love blowing his nose (1878–1881) mixed media (22 x 15) Musée Félicien Rops, Namur

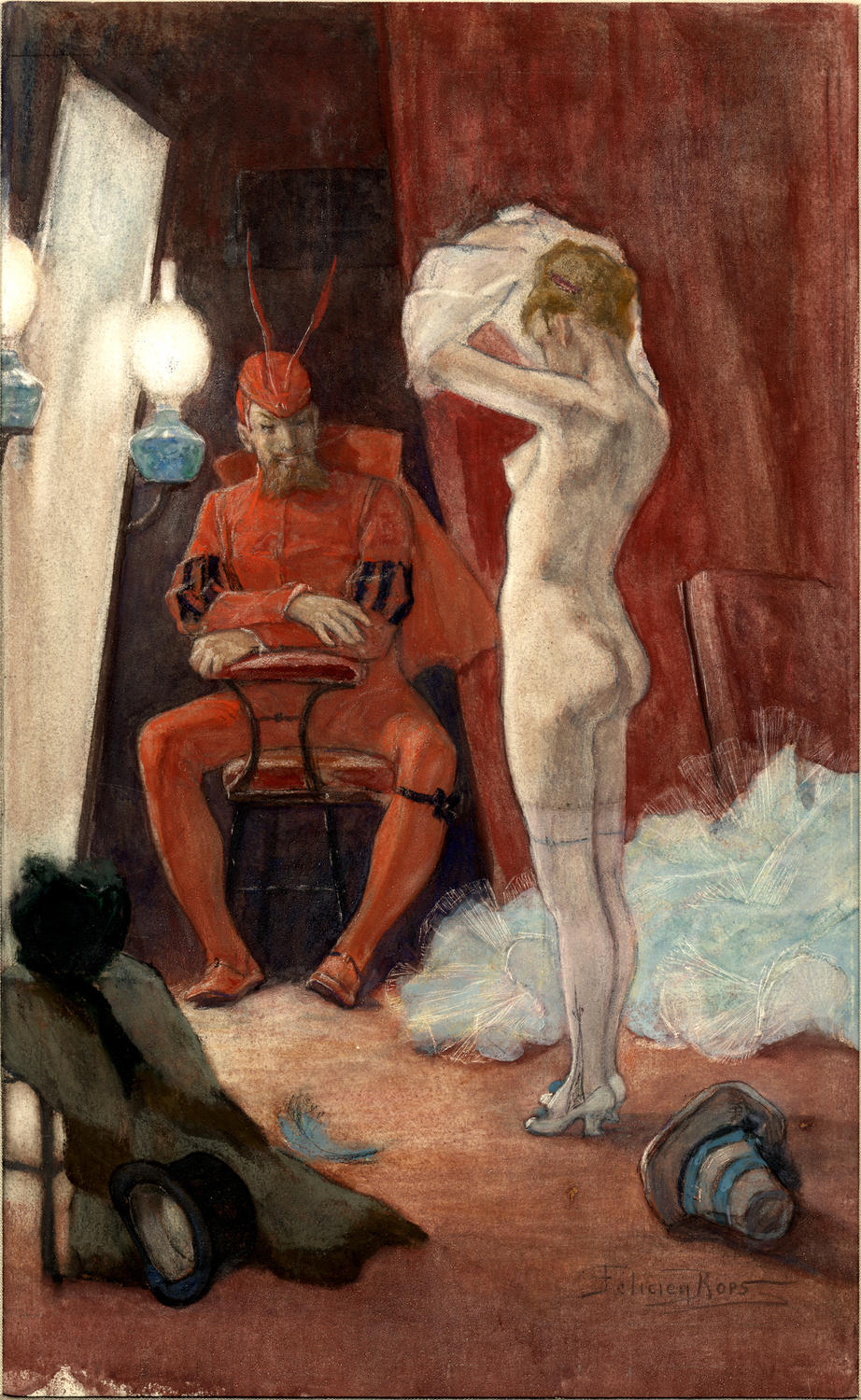
In the wings (1878–1880) watercolor, colored pencil, and pastel (26 x 16.5 cm) Musée Félicien Rops, Namur, Belgium

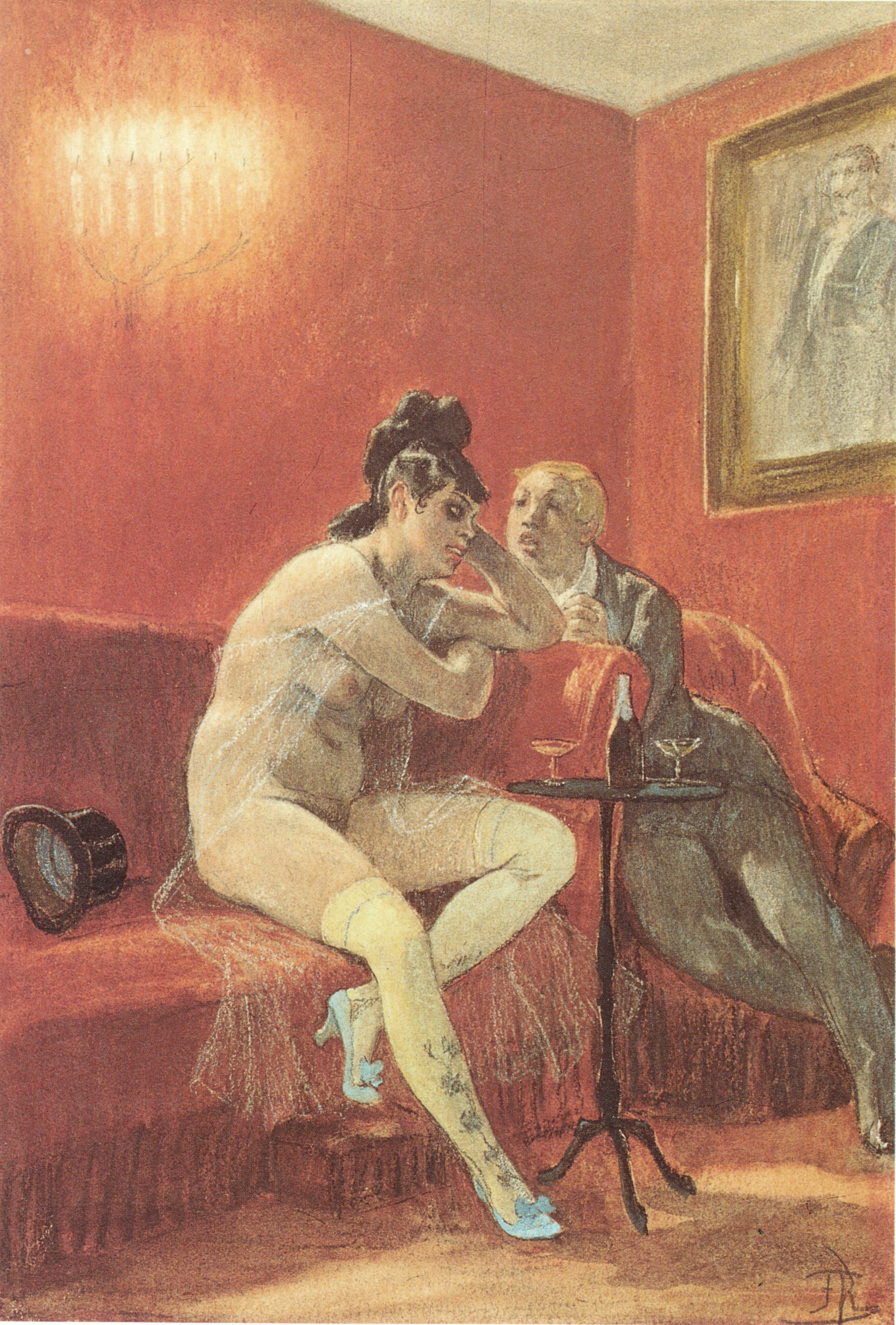
Cherub's Song (1878–1881) watercolor, gouache, pastel, chalk (22 x 15 cm) Musée Félicien Rops, Namur

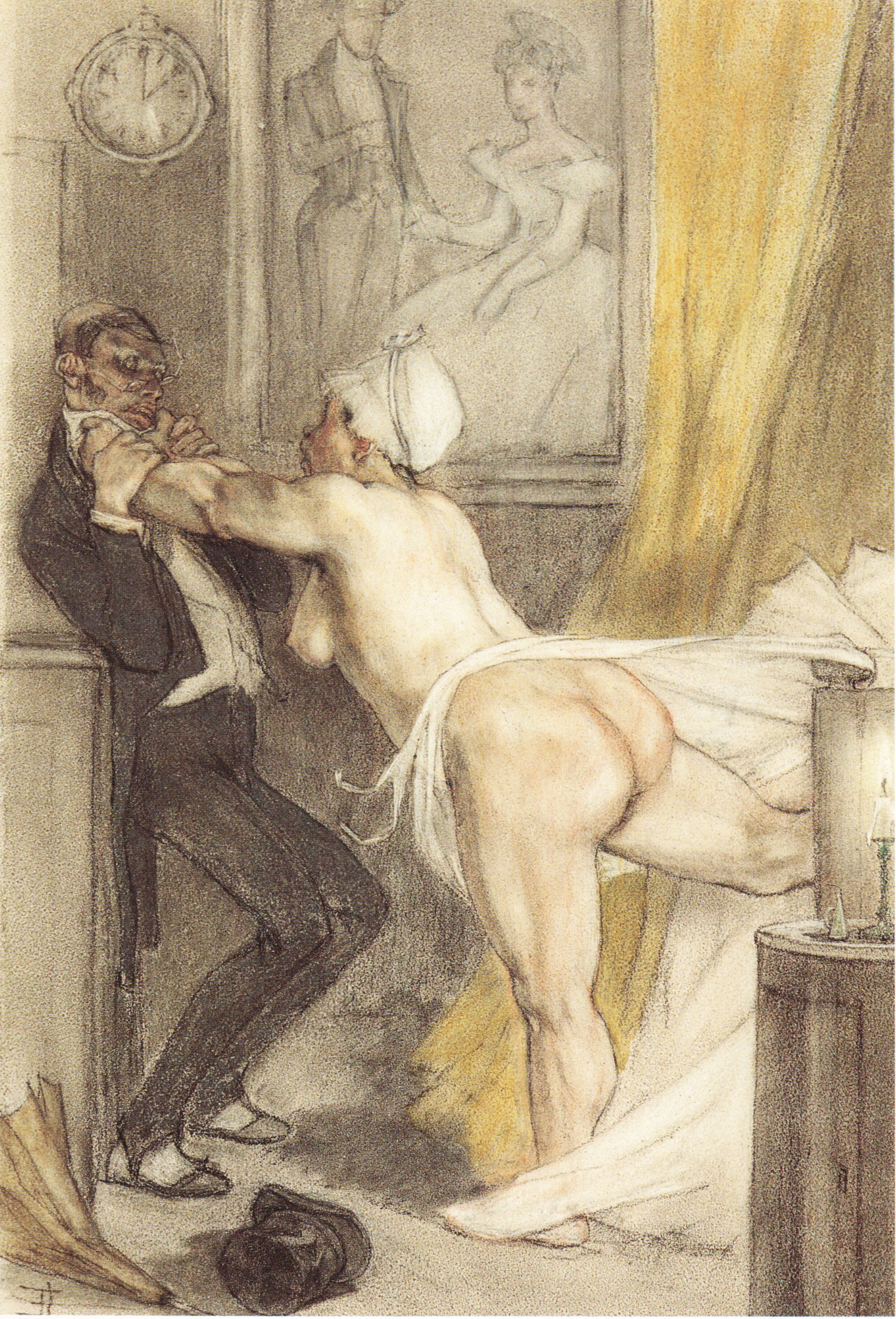
After Midnight, Returning makes you appreciate absence (no date) mixed media (22 x 15 cm) Private collection

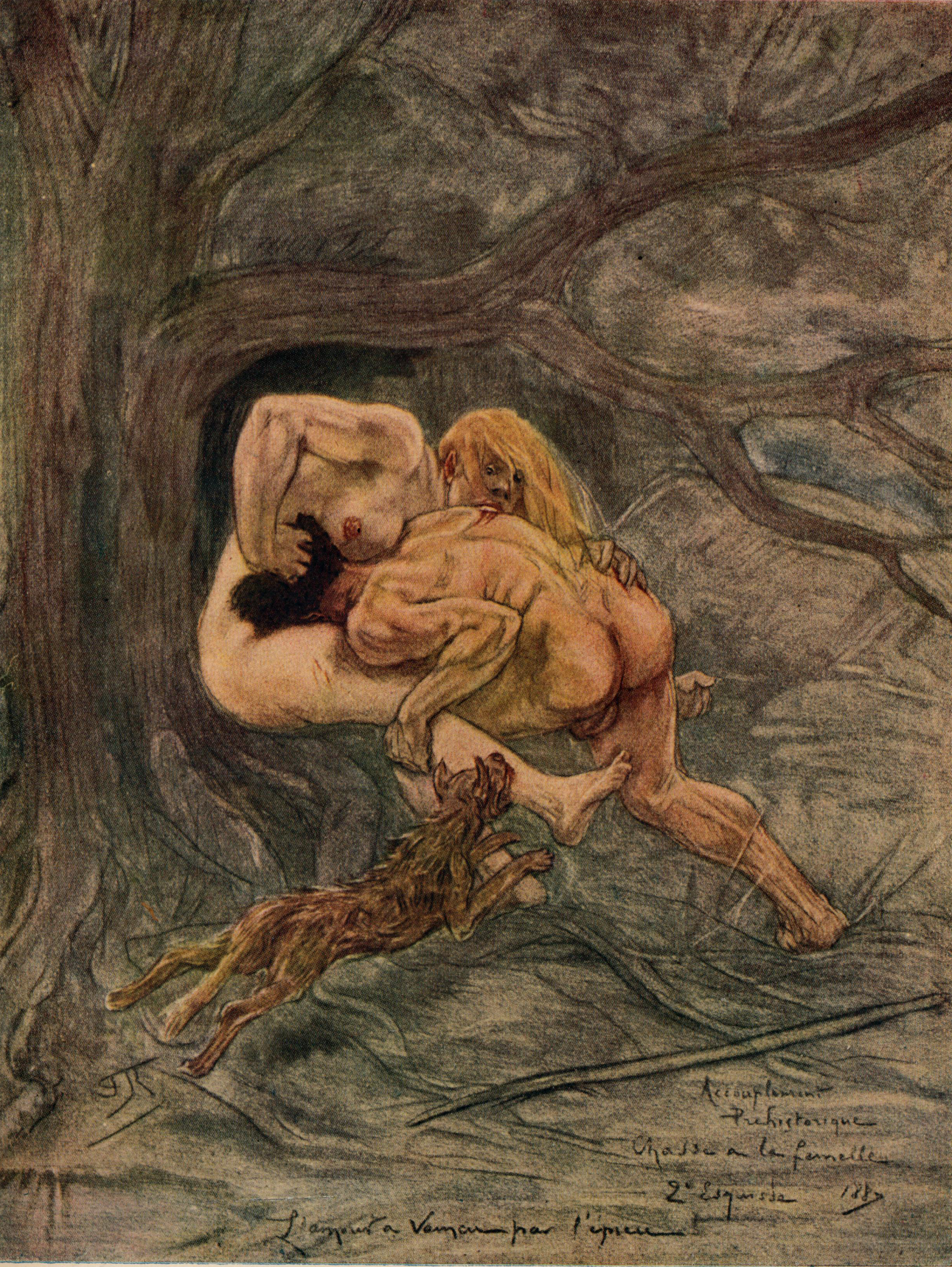
Prehistoric Coupling (1887) color pencil, watercolor, gouache (30.5 x 23.6 cm.) Namur

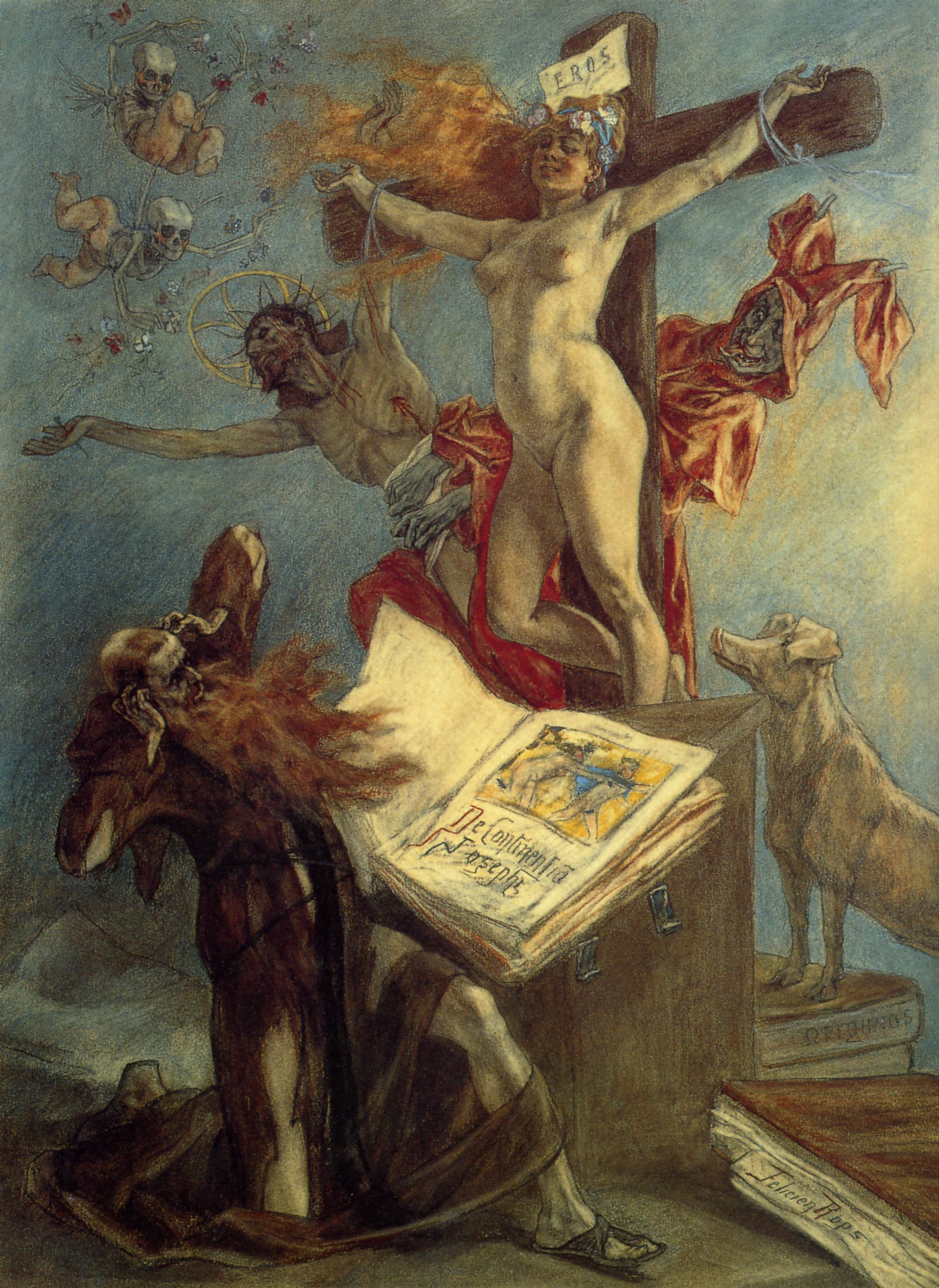
Temptation of Saint Anthony (1878) mixed media (74 x 54) Royal Library of Belgium, Brussels

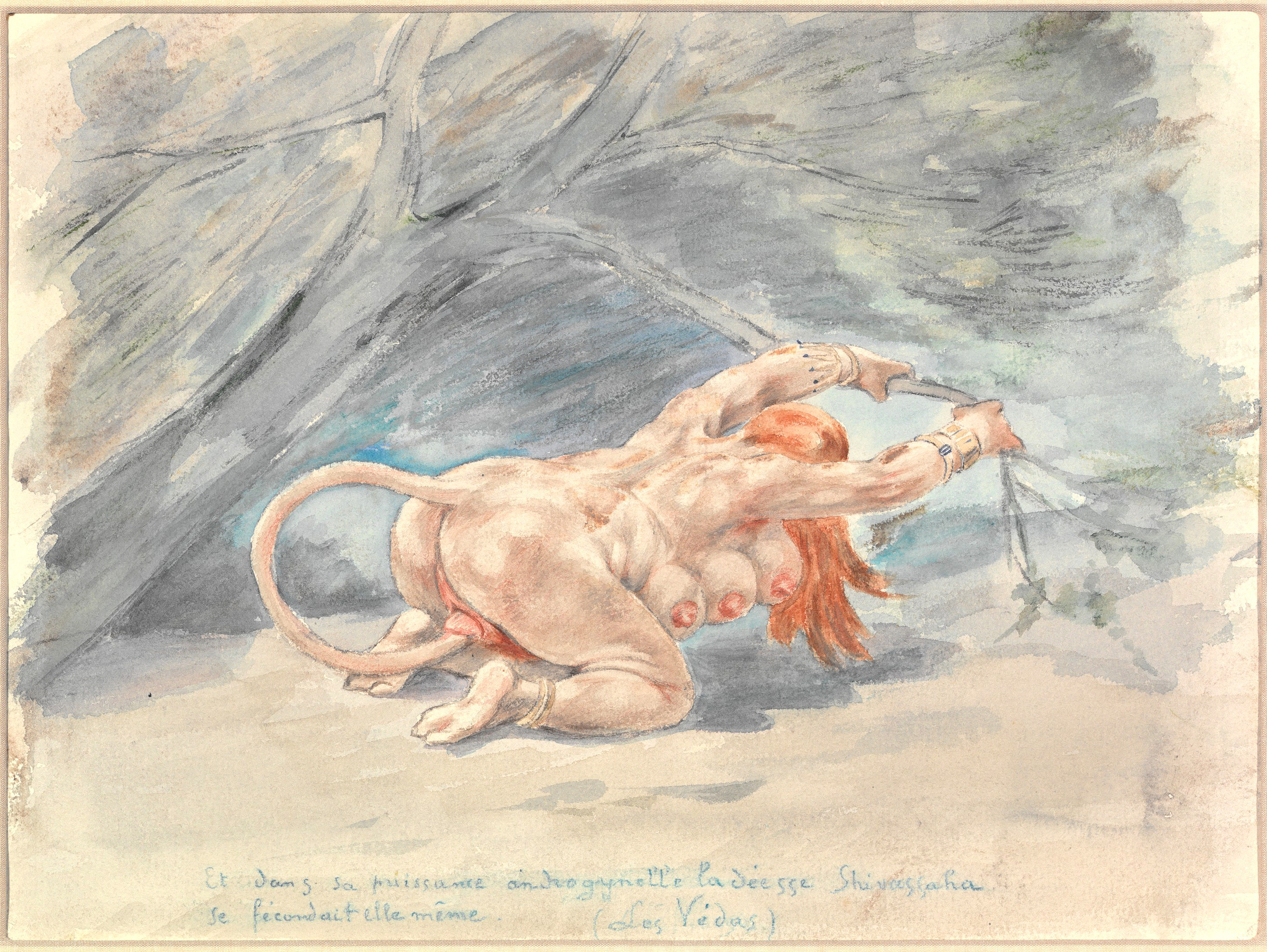
Untitled (no date) watercolor, colored pencil (22.9 x 28.6 cm) Metropolitan Museum of Art, New York. Caption (trans.) And in her androgynous power, the goddess Shivassaha fertilised herself. (from the Vedas).

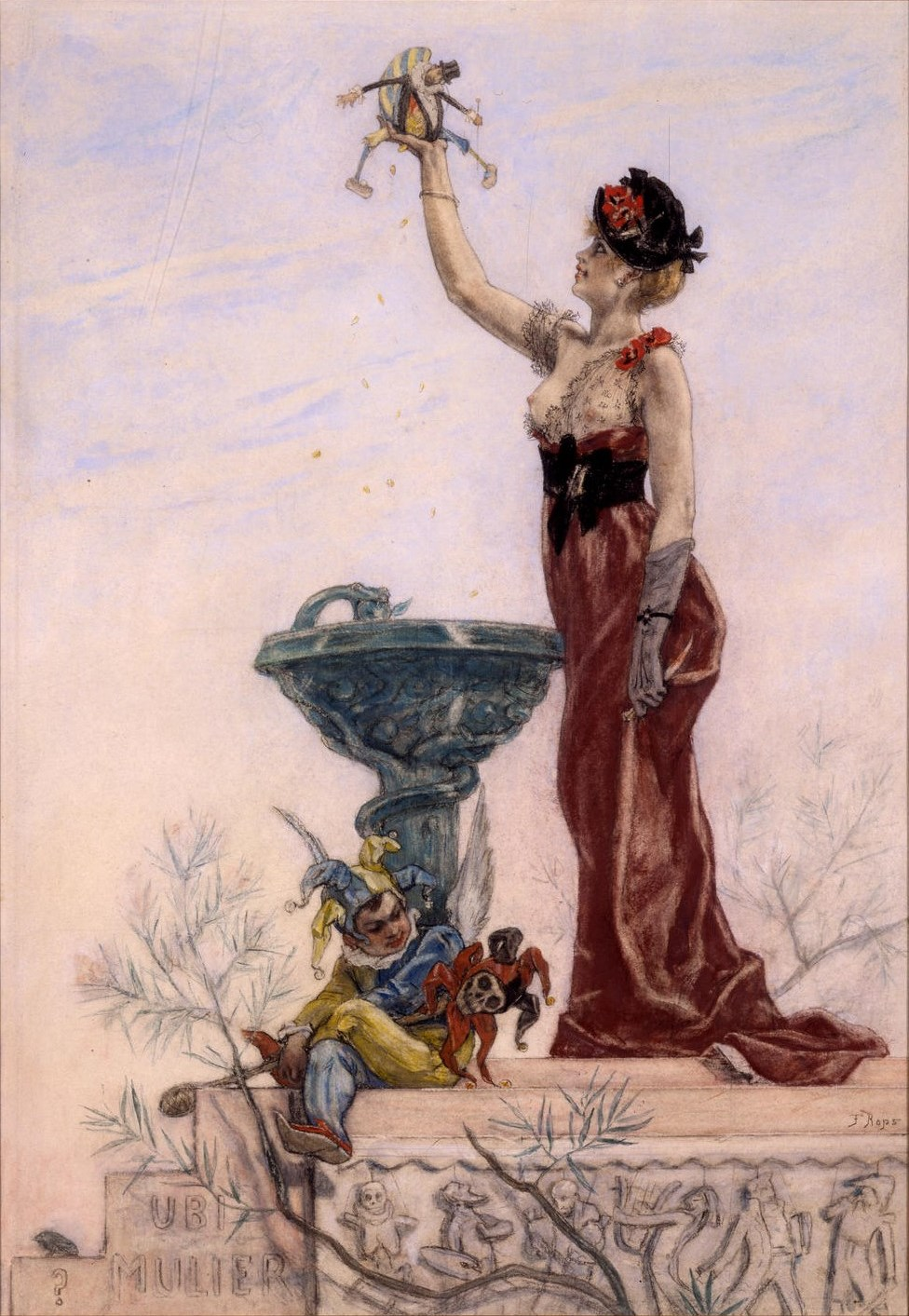
The Lady with the Puppet (ca. 1883–1885) mixed media (39.4 x 27.4 cm) Musée Félicien Rops, Namur

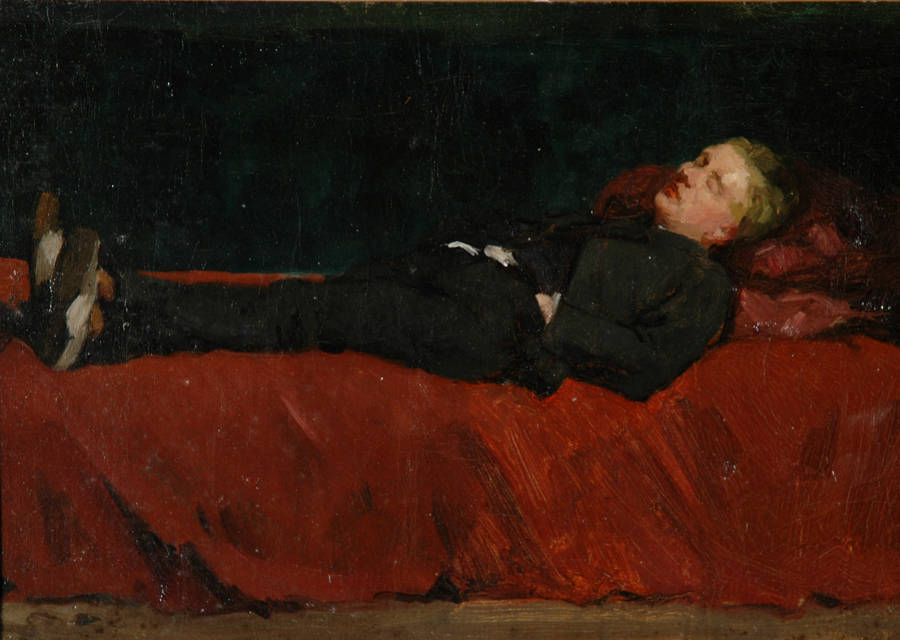
Paul Rops Sleeping (ca. 1872–75), oil on canvas (size unknown) Félicien Rops Fund, Namur, Belgium

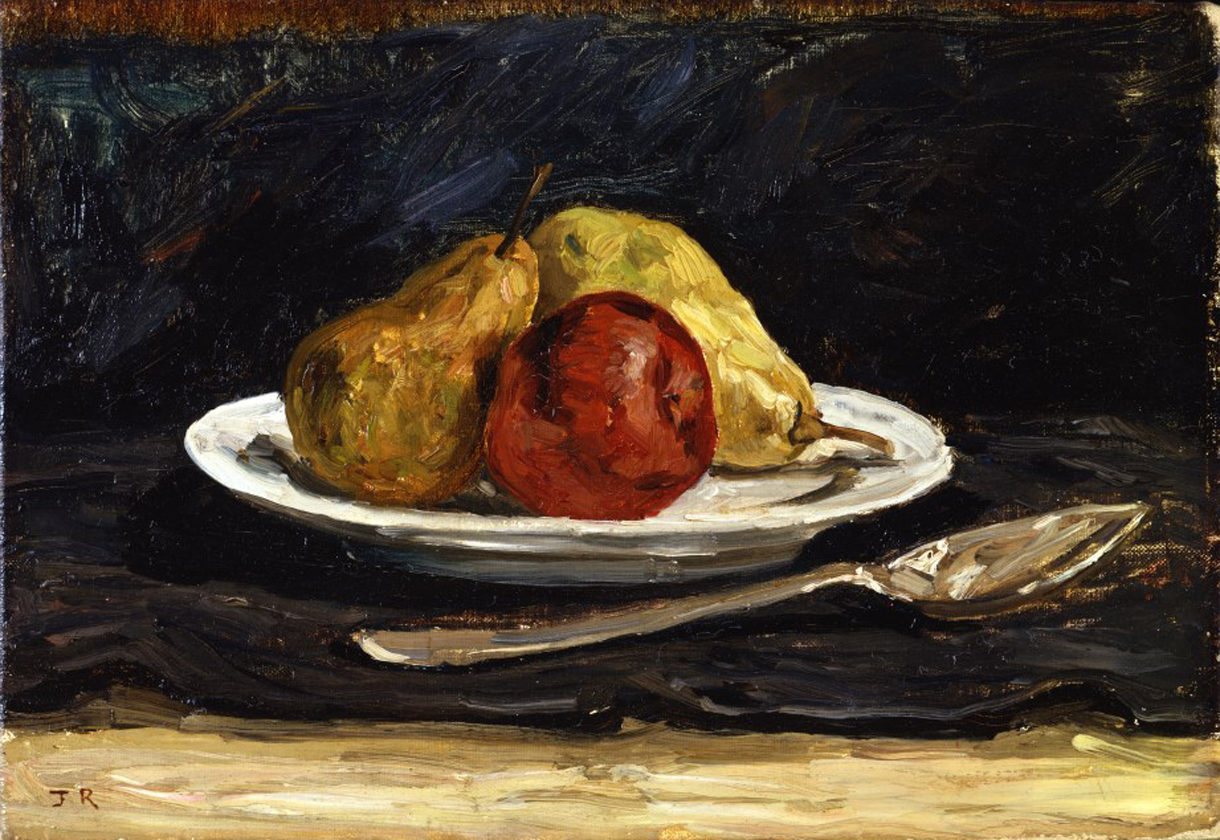
Pears and Apple on a Plate (1882) oil on canvas (22,5 x 32 cm) Friends of the Musée Félicien Rops, Namur

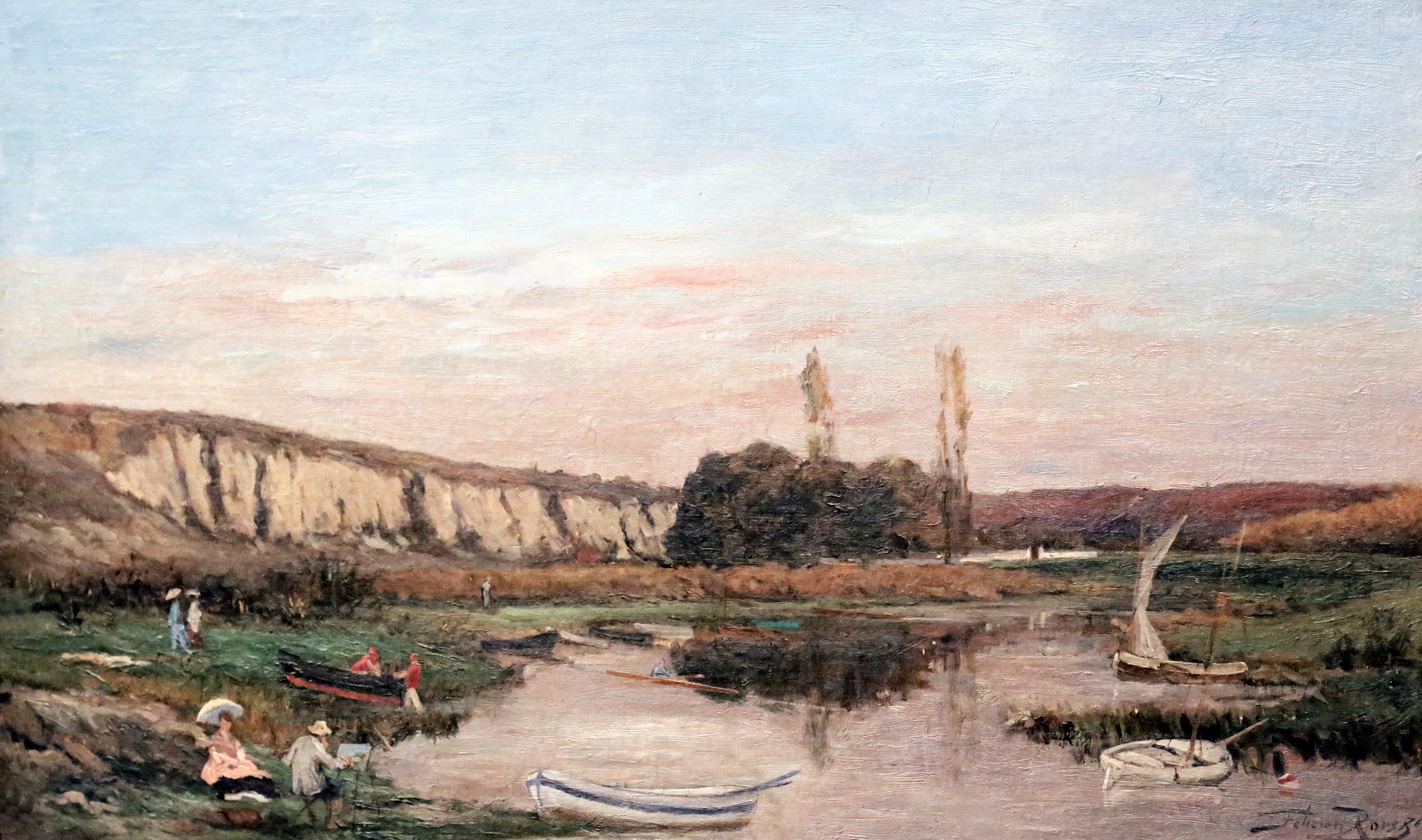
The Rocks of the Grands Malades (1876) oil on canvas, Musée des Beaux Arts Ixelles

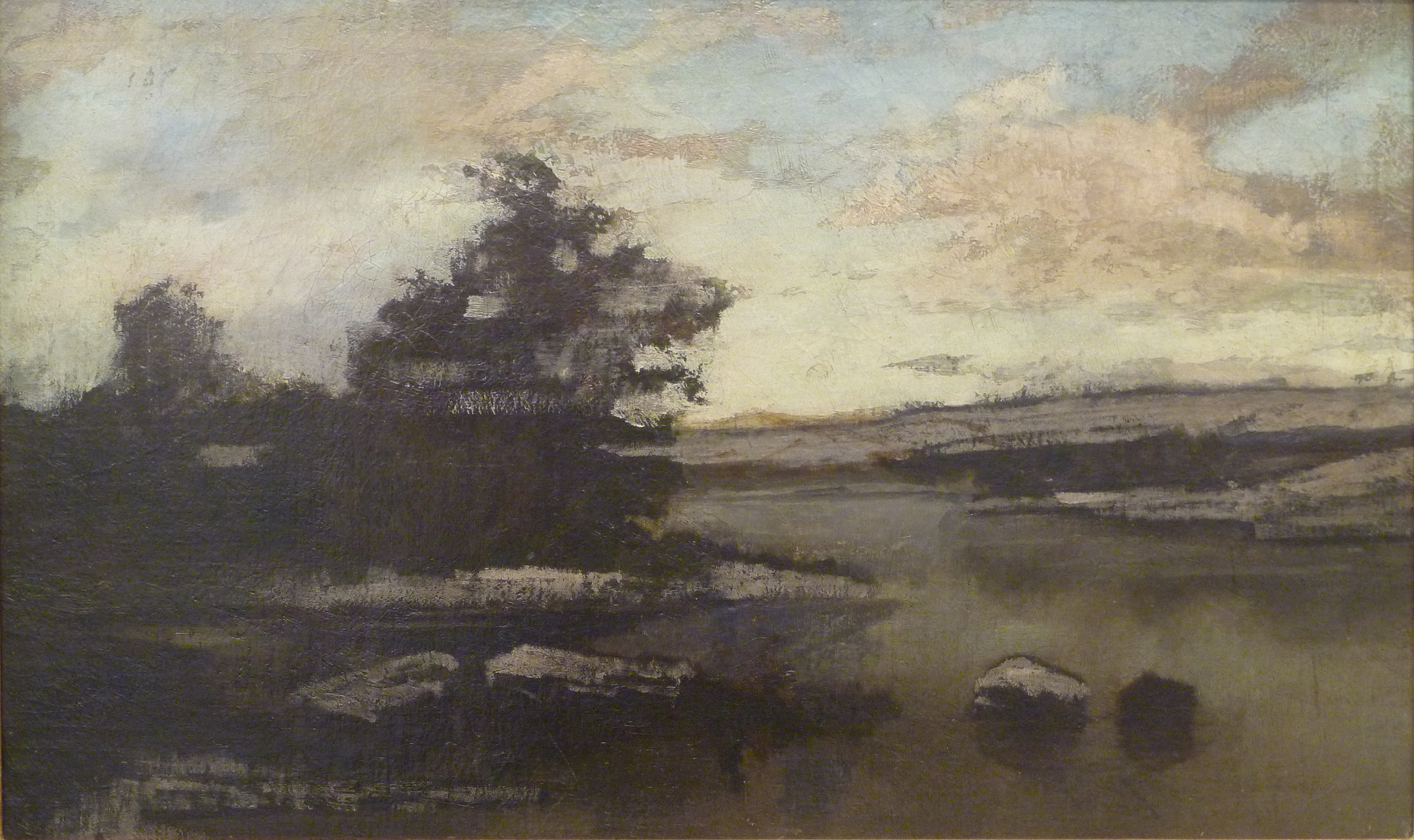
Snow in Thozée (no date) oil on canvas, Belfius Bank & Insurance, Brussels

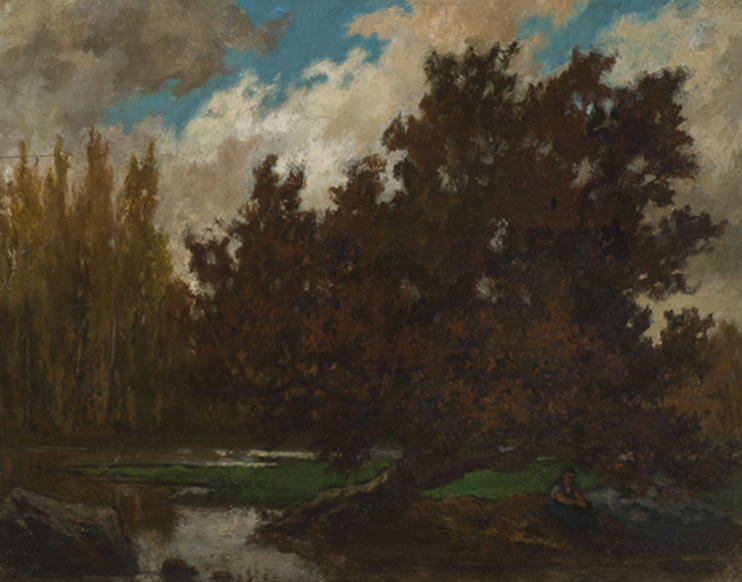
The Pond of Bambois (1865) oil on panel (18.5 × 24 cm) Charleroi Museum of Fine Arts

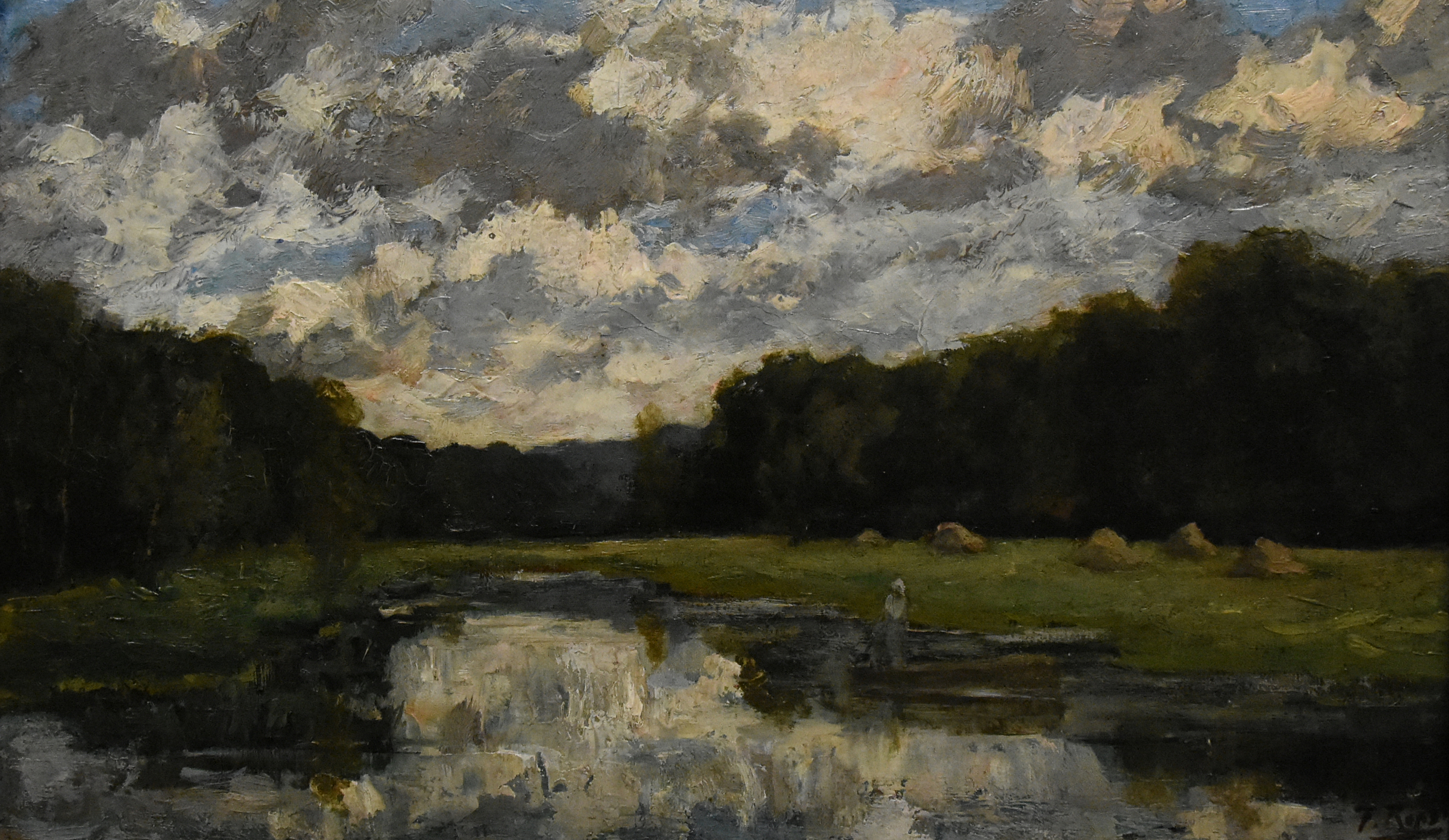
More from Bambois (no date) oil on canvas, Musée Félicien Rops, Namur, Belgium

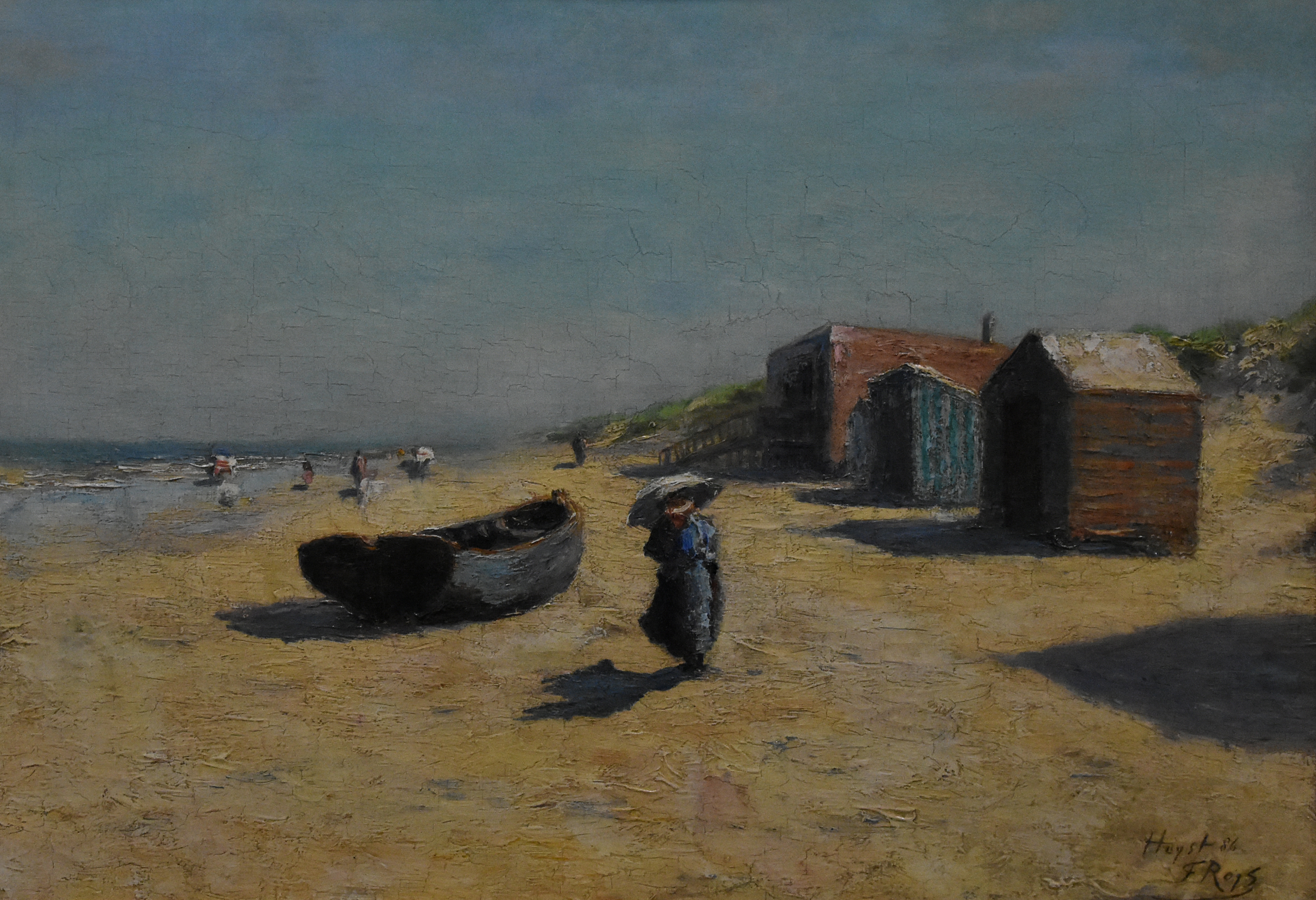
The Beach in Heist (1886) oil on canvas, Musée Félicien Rops Namen, Belgium

=== Prints and book illustrations ===
"Rops was a printmaker of brilliant technique and original content whose handling of dry point (etching directly on the plate) marks him as one of the masters of the medium." Although Rops worked in a wide range of media, his primary means of expression was printmaking. He worked with lithography, wood engraving, etching, aquatint, mezzotint, soft-ground etching, burin engravings, heliogravure and other techniques producing hundreds of prints in his life. His prints are remarkably diverse and span the full spectrum of the styles and subject matter that he explored throughout his life. He begin shifting from lithography to intaglio in the 1860s when he studied etching with Félix Bracquemond and Jules Ferdinand Jacquemart in Paris. Félix Bracquemond was one of the central figures in reviving an interest in etching among artists of the time, encouraging and coaching artists such as Édouard Manet, Edgar Degas, Camille Pissarro, and others to explore the neglected art form. By the end of the decade Rops had all but abandoned lithography. Rops founded the International Society of Etchers about 1869 or 1870. Although the society received praises from artists and royalty alike, financially he struggled to keep it going for more than two to three years.

Fascinated by the processes, he was constantly experimenting with printmaking techniques throughout his career. Starting around the early 1870s, Rops begin using soft-ground etching, a technique practiced by few artists of his day, often combining it with mezzotint, aquatint, dry point, and other techniques, sometimes adding hand-coloring to the plates. He photo-mechanically (heliogravure) transferred many of his original drawings to intaglio plates, and often developed the images further in that medium with any number of techniques such as dry point, aquatint, soft-ground etching, etc. However, traditional soft-ground methods did not work well for his purposes, so in collaboration with his friend and colleague Armand Rassenfosse, they invented a process they called "Ropsenfosse". Ropsenfosse used several different soft-ground formulas and was likely the first soft-ground method used to produce color prints with two or more plates.

His etchings were popular and many of the progressive writers, poets, and publishers of late 19th-century literature sought out his talents for their publications. His prints were widely distributed in the books he illustrated and influenced many younger artists, including several Symbolists and Expressionist such as Max Beckmann, Lovis Corinth, James Ensor, Alfred Kubin, Fernand Khnopff, Max Klinger, Edvard Munch and others. The Blue Angel largely was inspired by a figure by Rops that impressed director Josef von Sternberg.

==== Gallery II: prints and book illustrations ====
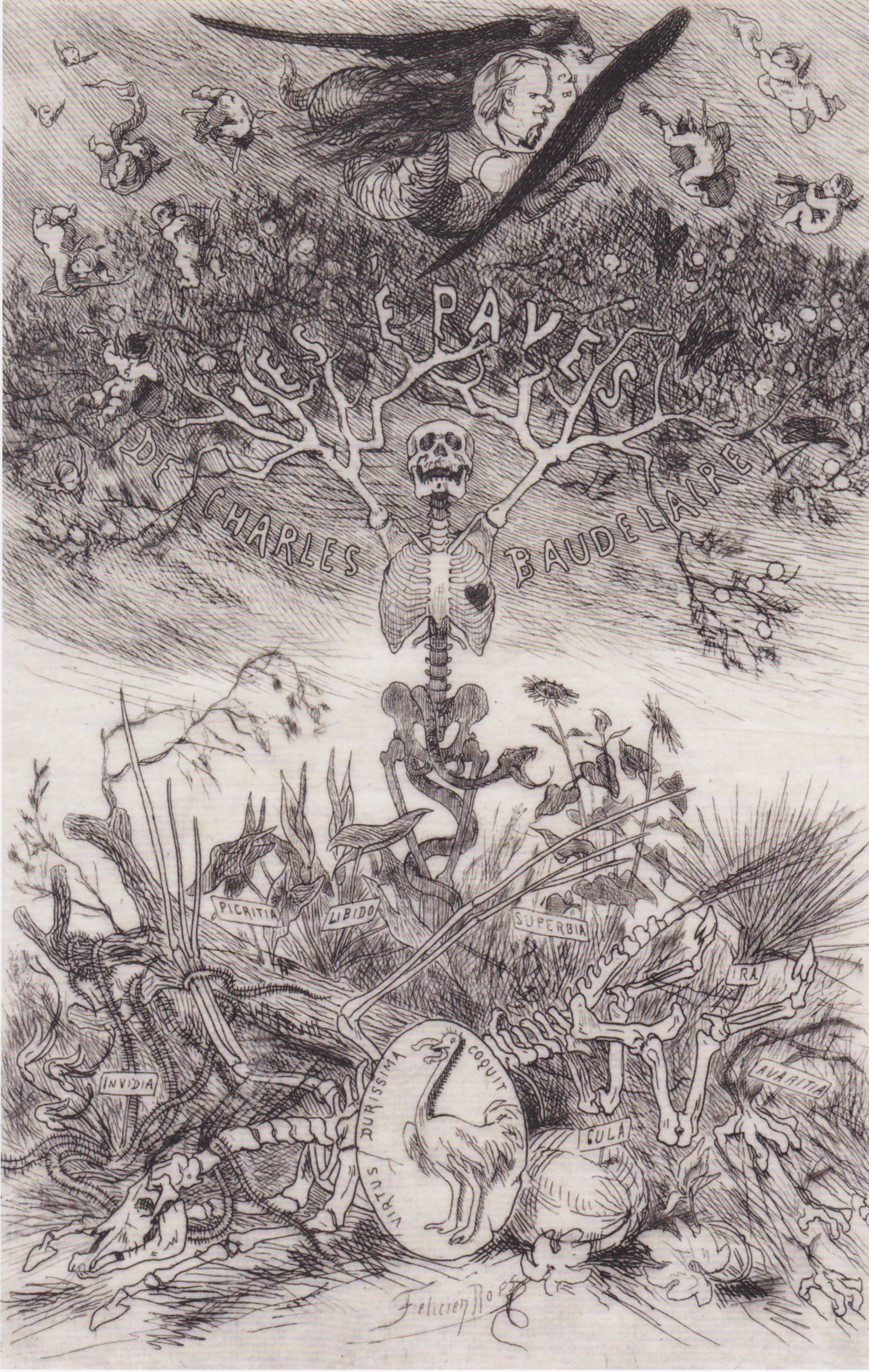
Frontispiece for Les Épaves by Baudelaire (1868) etching (16 x 13,3 cm) Musée Félicien Rops, Namur

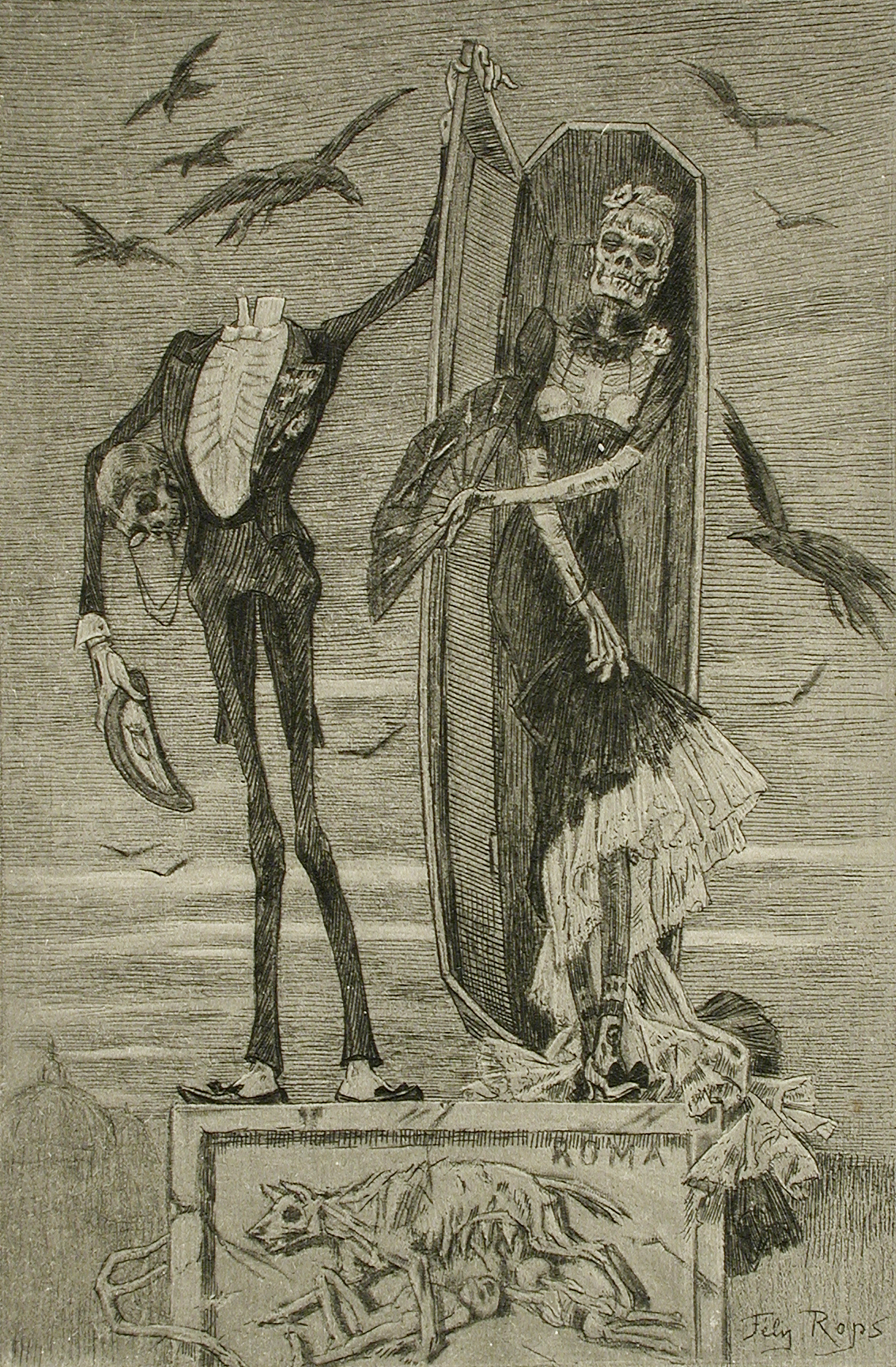
Frontispiece for The Supreme Vice by Peladan (1884) etching and aquatint (11.75 x 7.78 cm) Los Angeles County Museum of Art

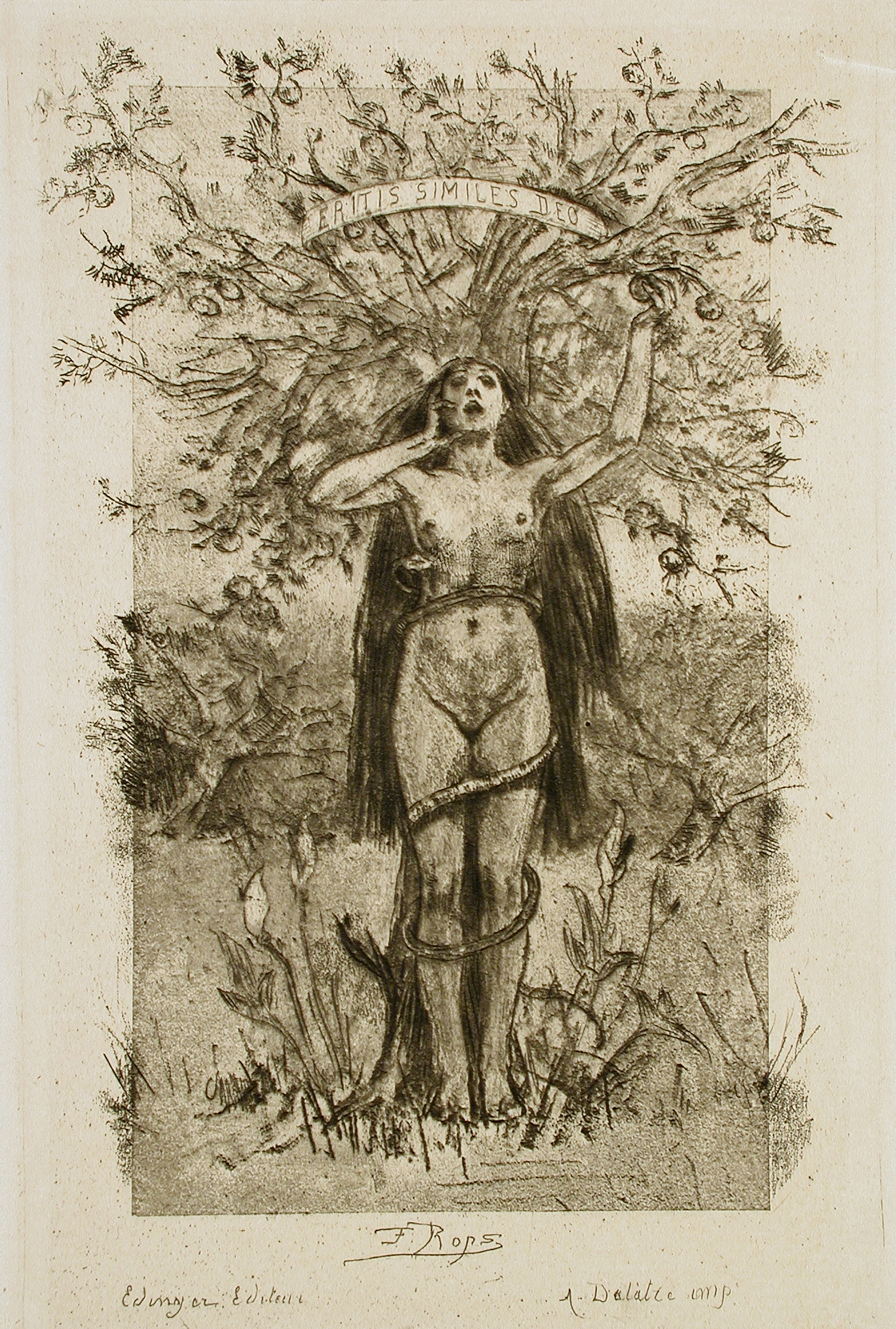
Frontispiece for A Heart Lost by Peladan (1888) soft-ground etching (16.67 x 10.8 cm) Los Angeles County Museum

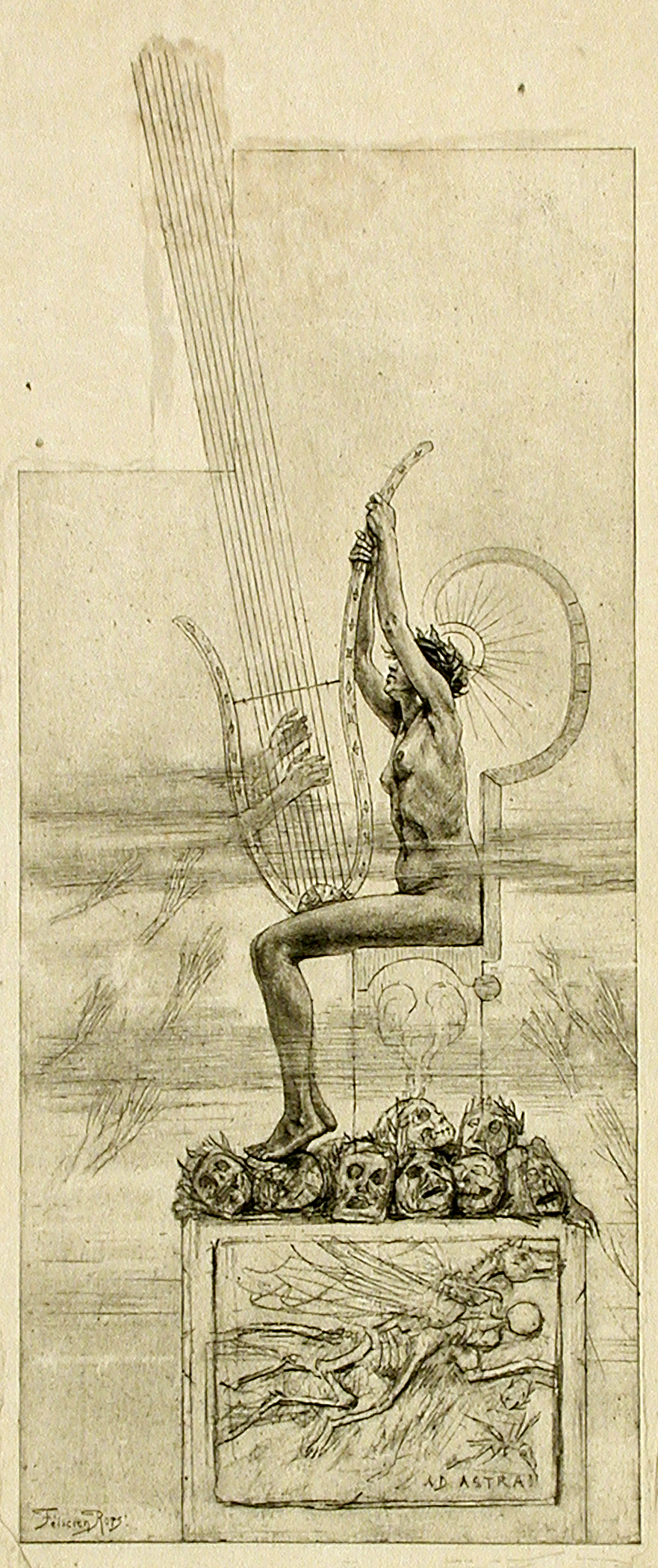
Frontispiece for Poésies by Mallarmé, The Lyre (1895) etching & drypoint (23 x 16 cm) L.A. Co. Museum

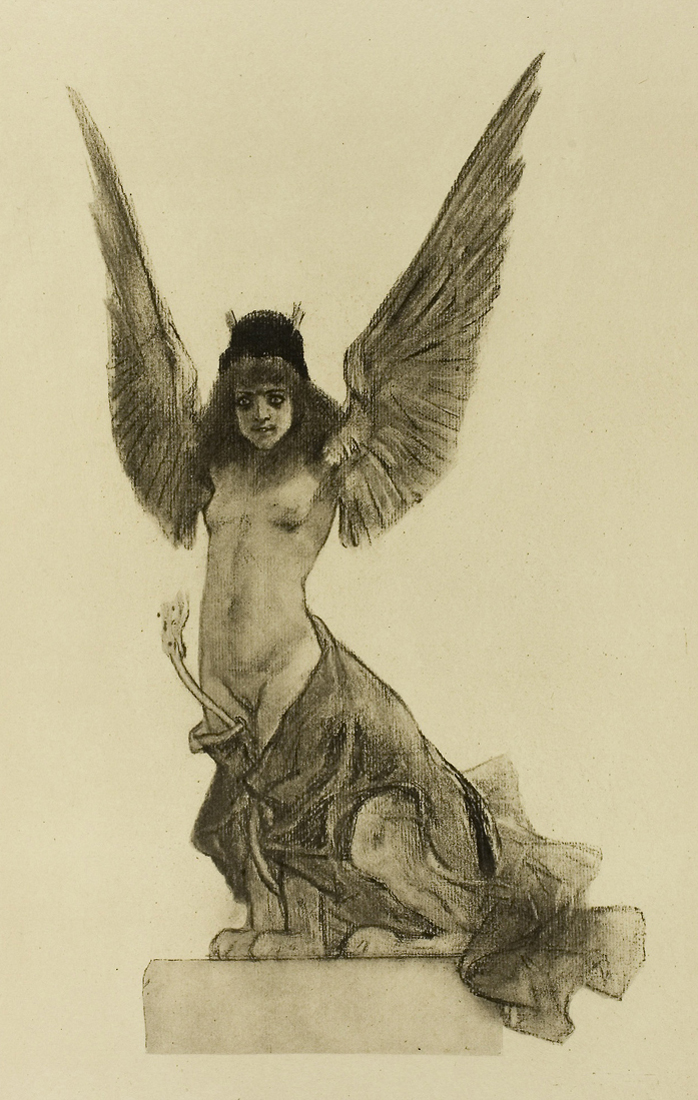
Frontispiece for Chair [Flesh] by Verlaine, Parallelism (ca. 1896) heliogravure (33.5 × 21.2 mm) The Art Institute of Chicago

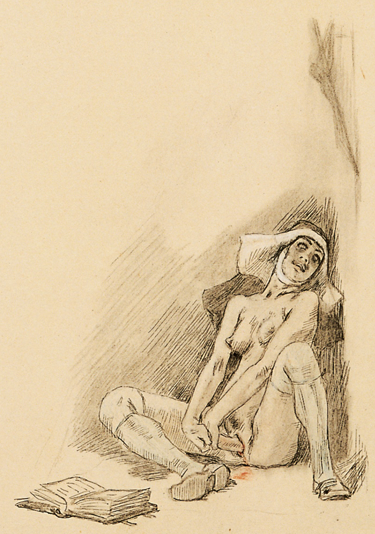
Sainte-Thérèse in ecstasy, 19th century

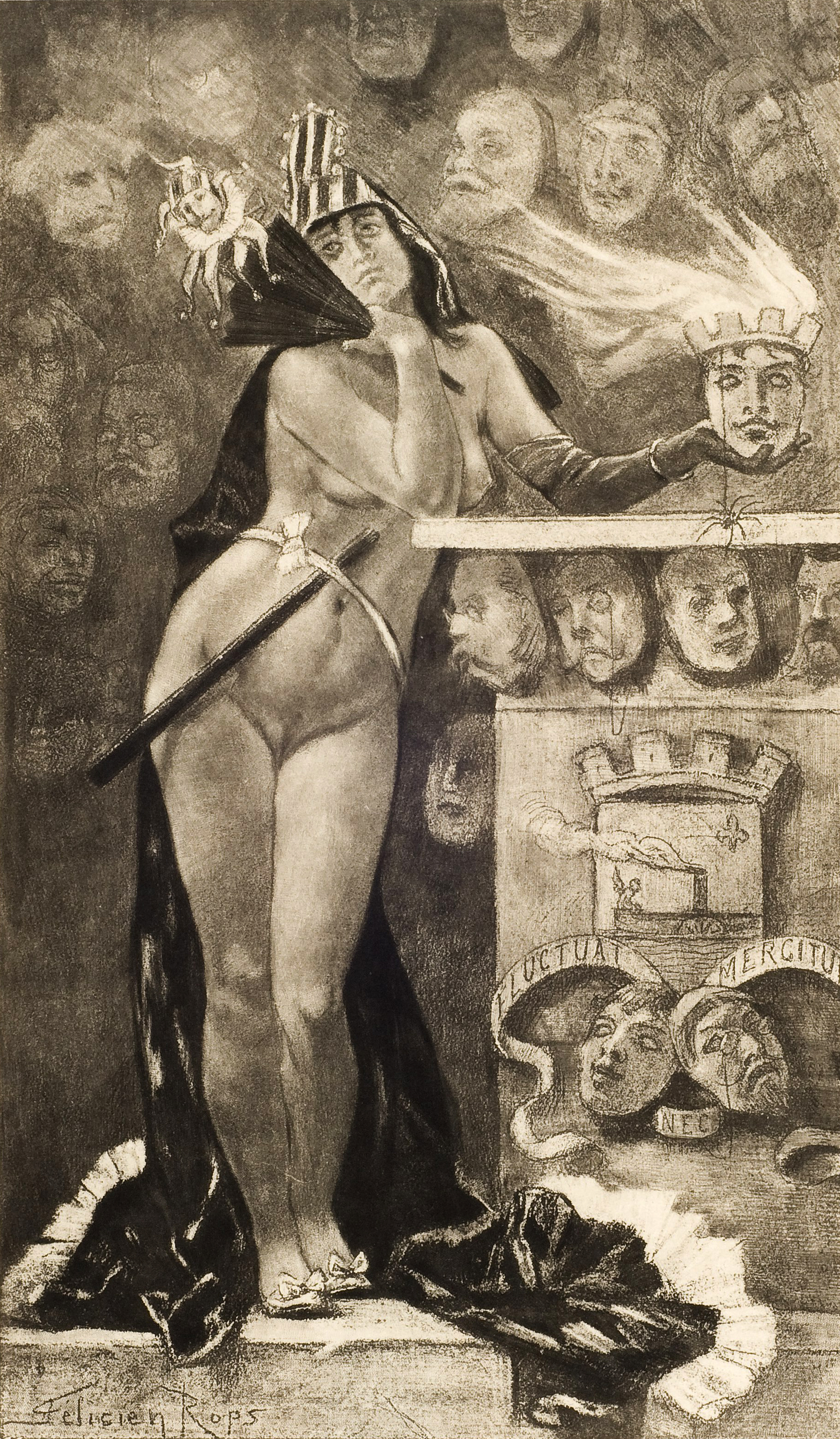
Parisian Masks (no date) heliogravure (29.2 x 17.2 cm) Michael C. Carlos Museum, Emory University, Atlanta

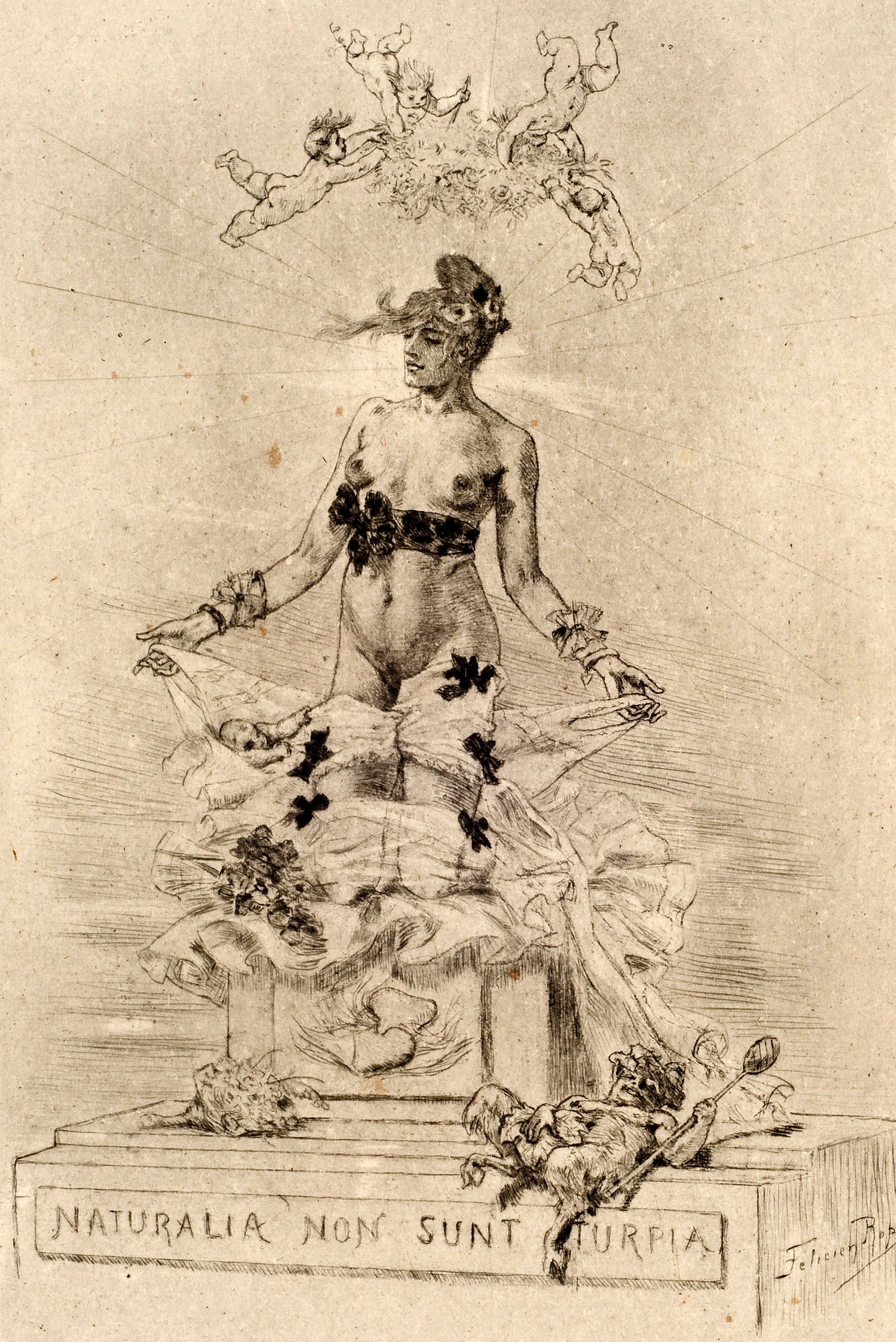
Holocauste, Naturalia Non Sunt Turpia (What is natural is not dirty) (1895) heliogravure, drypoint (21.6 x 15.2 cm) Michael C. Carlos Museum, Emory University, Atlanta

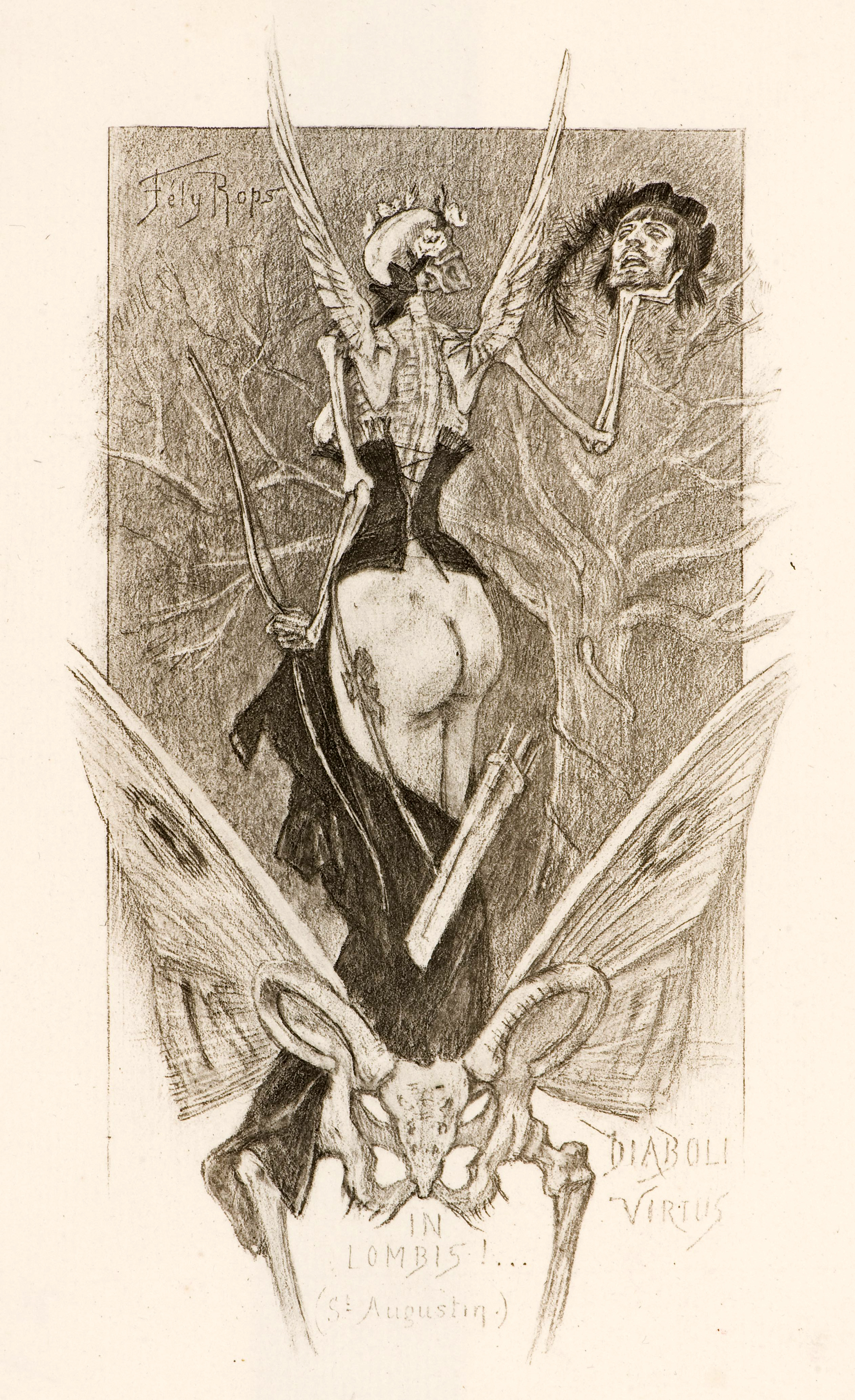
Sentimental Initiation (1887) heliogravure, Michael C. Carlos Museum, Emory University, Atlanta

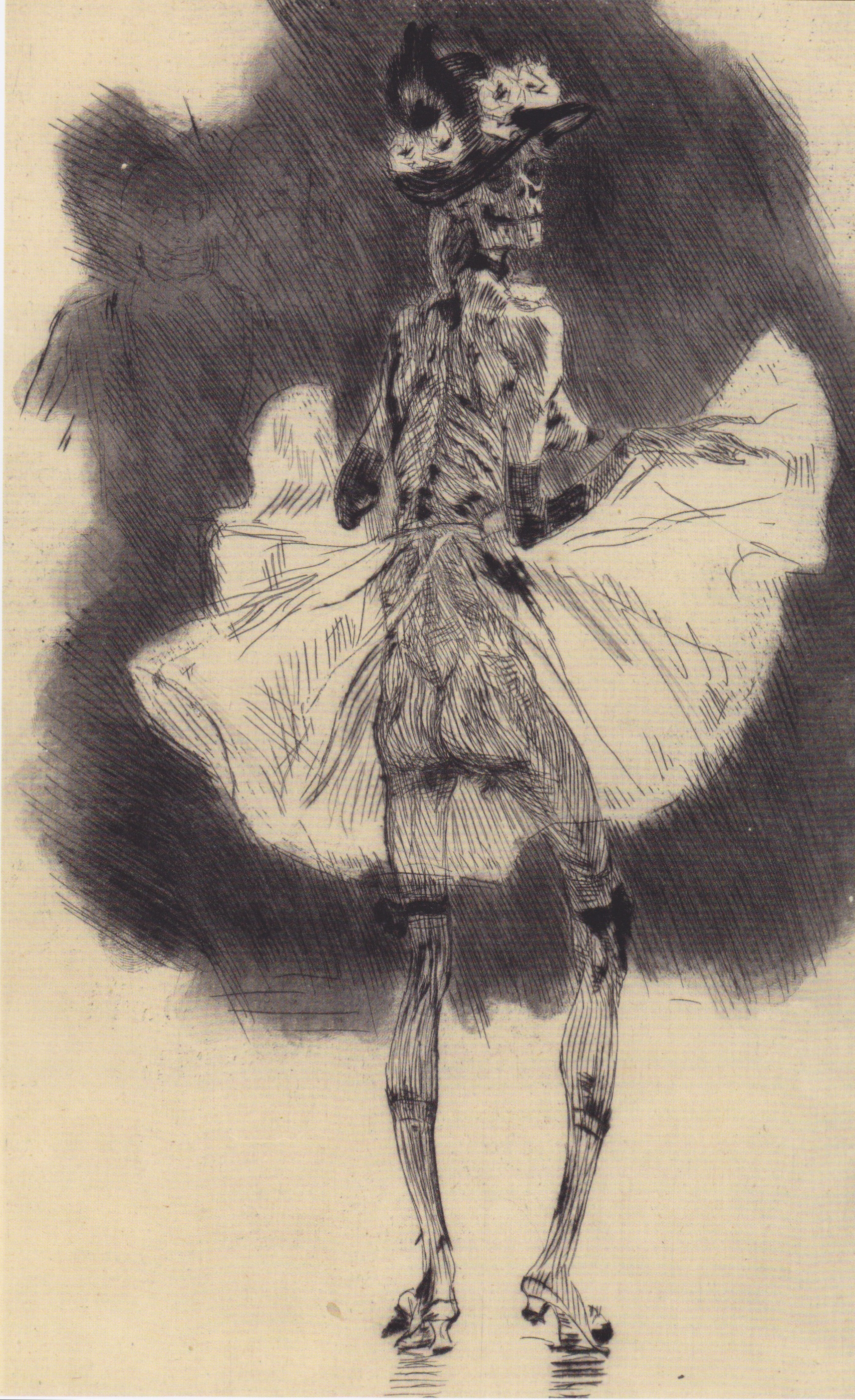
The Dance of Death (ca. 1865) etching (55 x 37 cm)

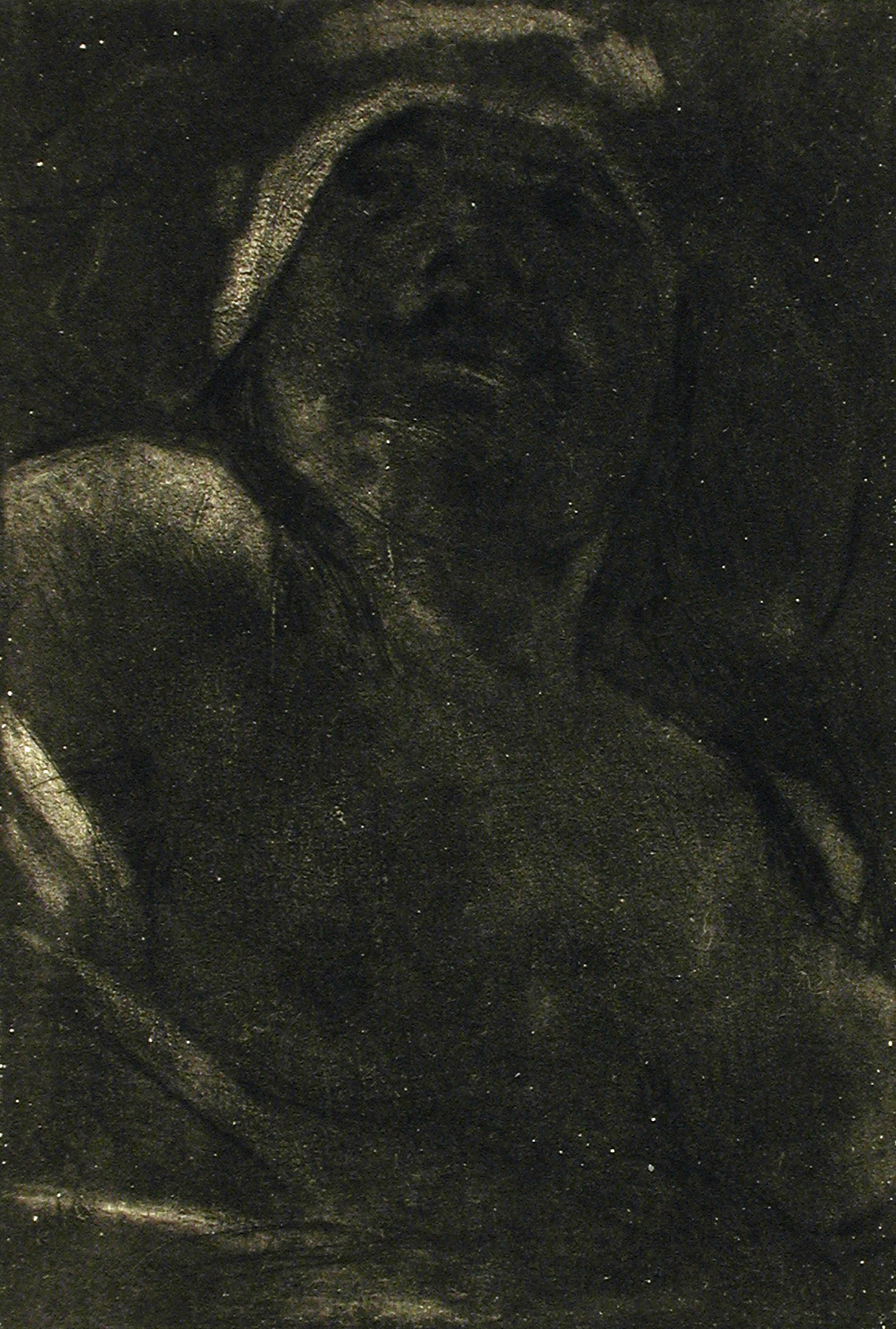
Flemish Madness (no date) aquatint (12.07 x 9.53 cm) Los Angeles County Museum of Art

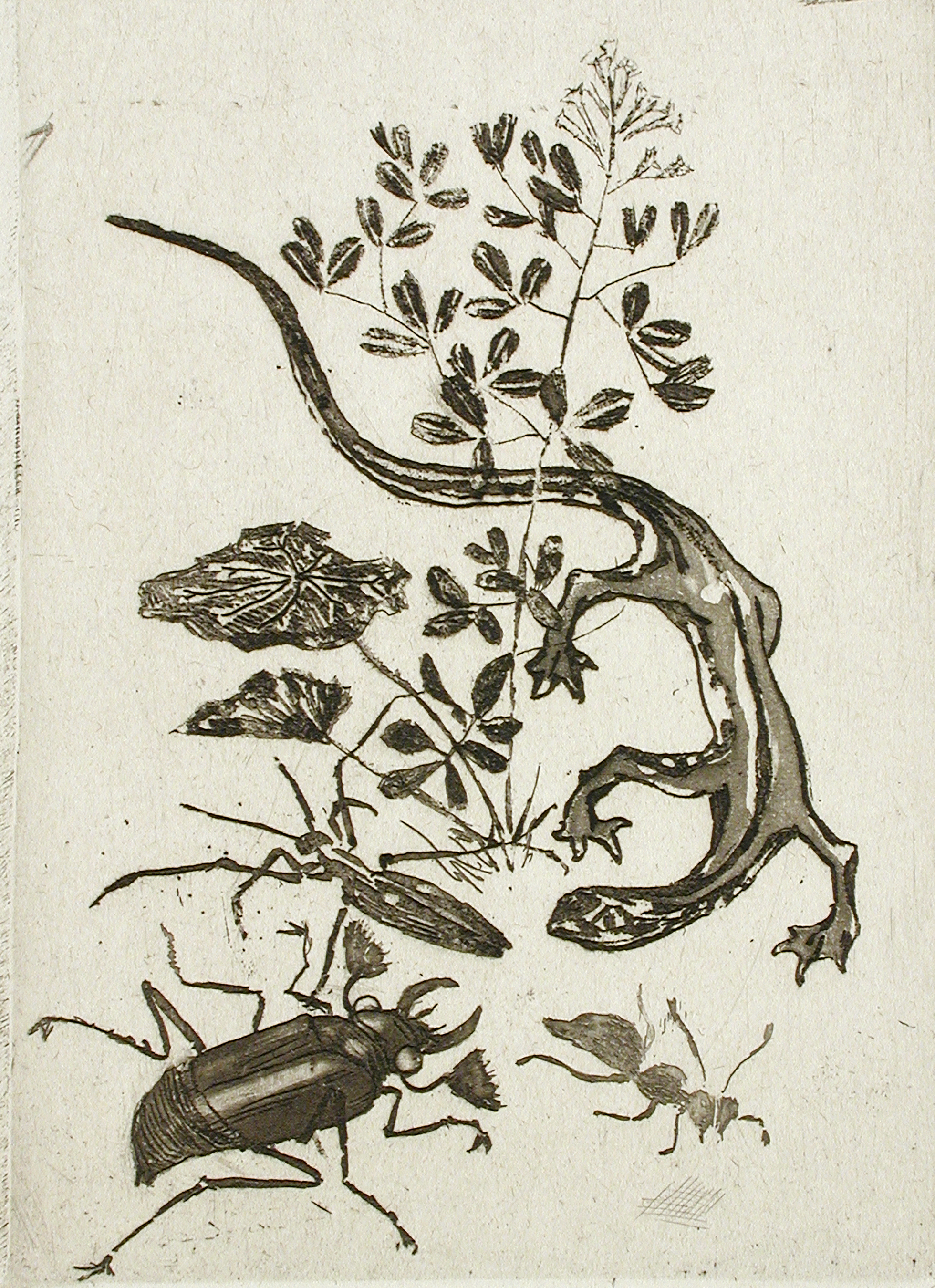
Japanese Salamander and Beetle (no date) aquatint (9.21 x 6.67 cm) Los Angeles County Museum

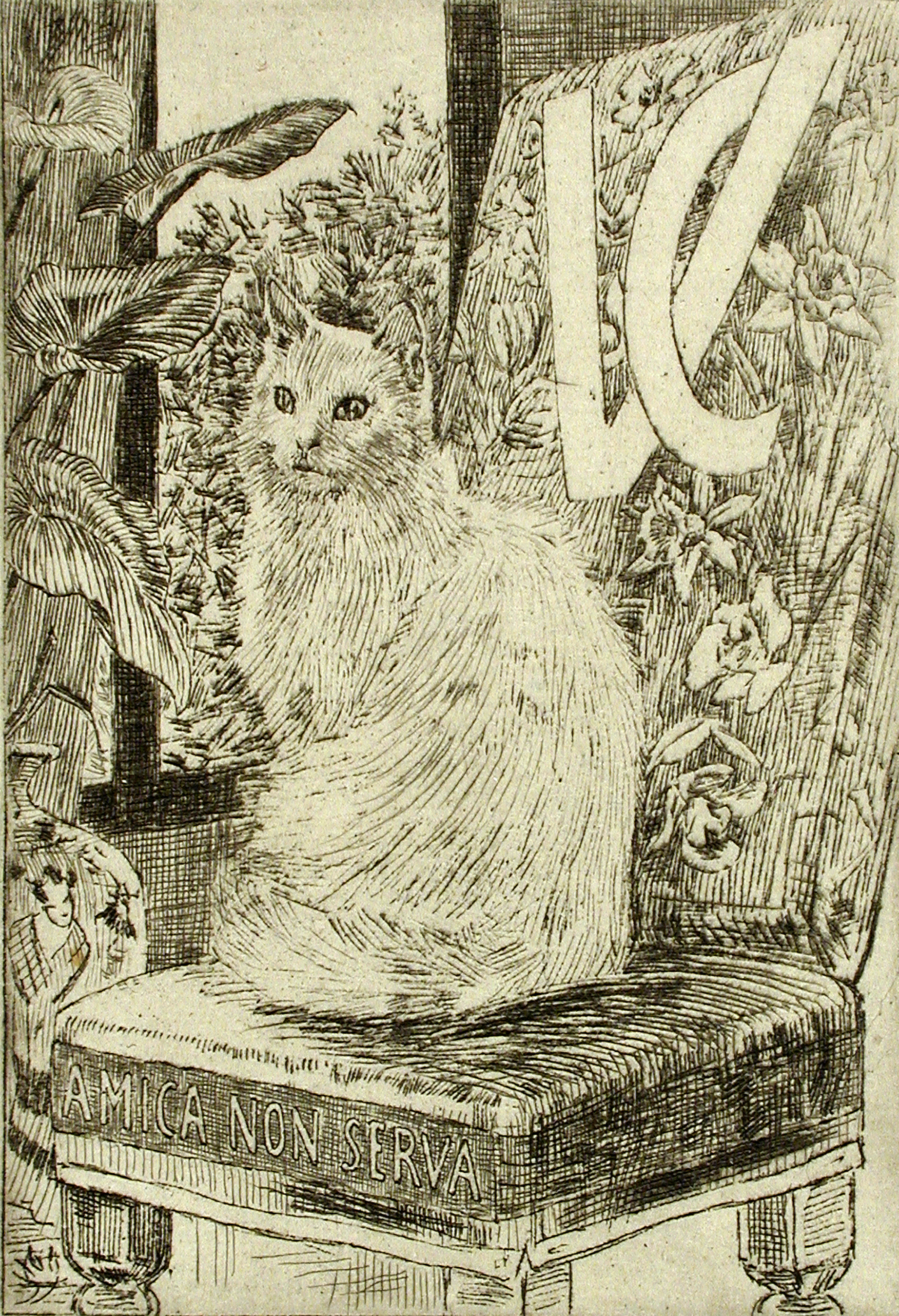
The Cat [Amica Non Serva, Friend Not Servant] (no date) etching (8.26 x 5.87 cm) Los Angeles County Museum of Art

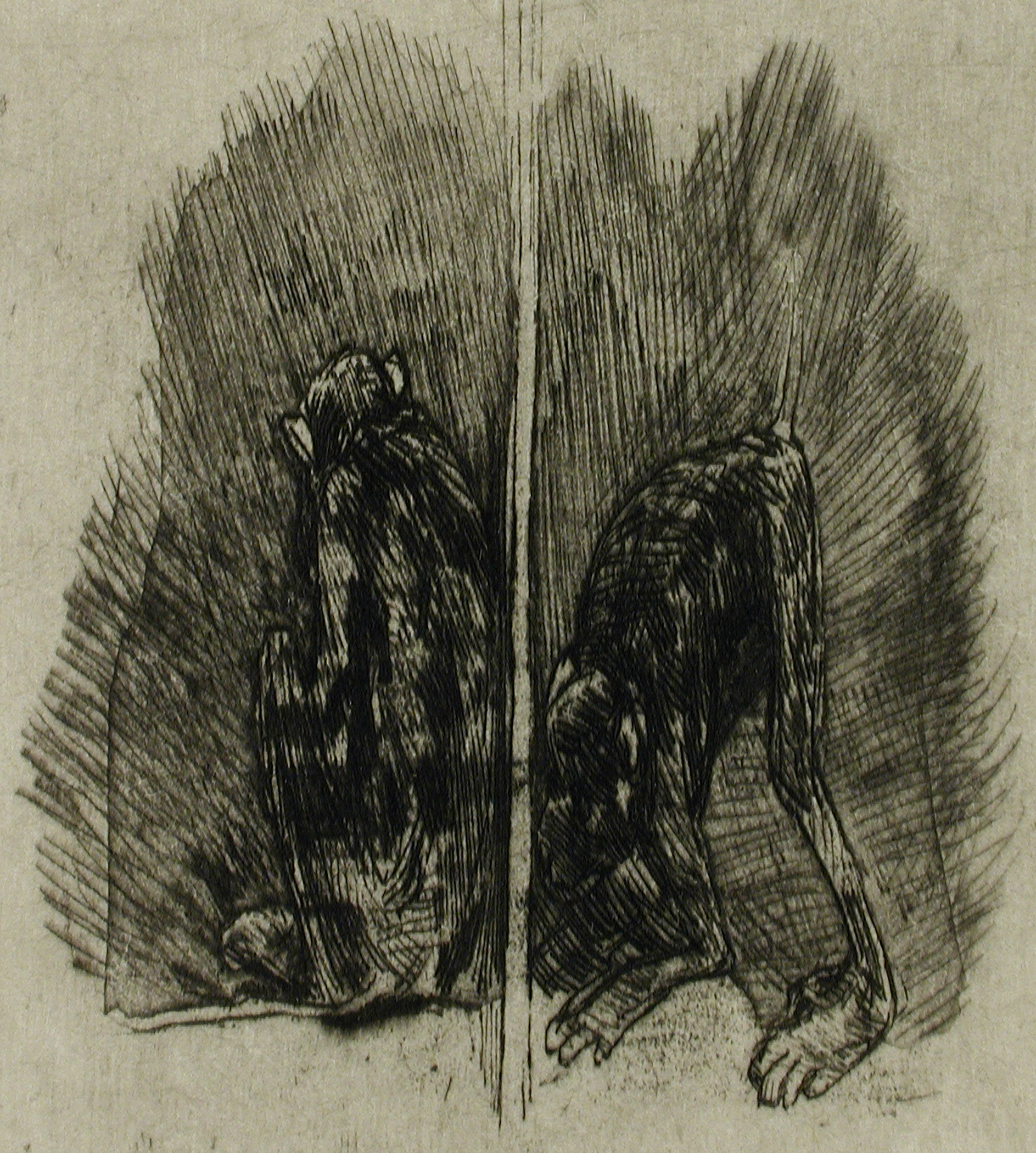
Separated or Simian Spring (no date) etching with aquatint (6.51 x 9.68 cm) Los Angeles County Museum of Art

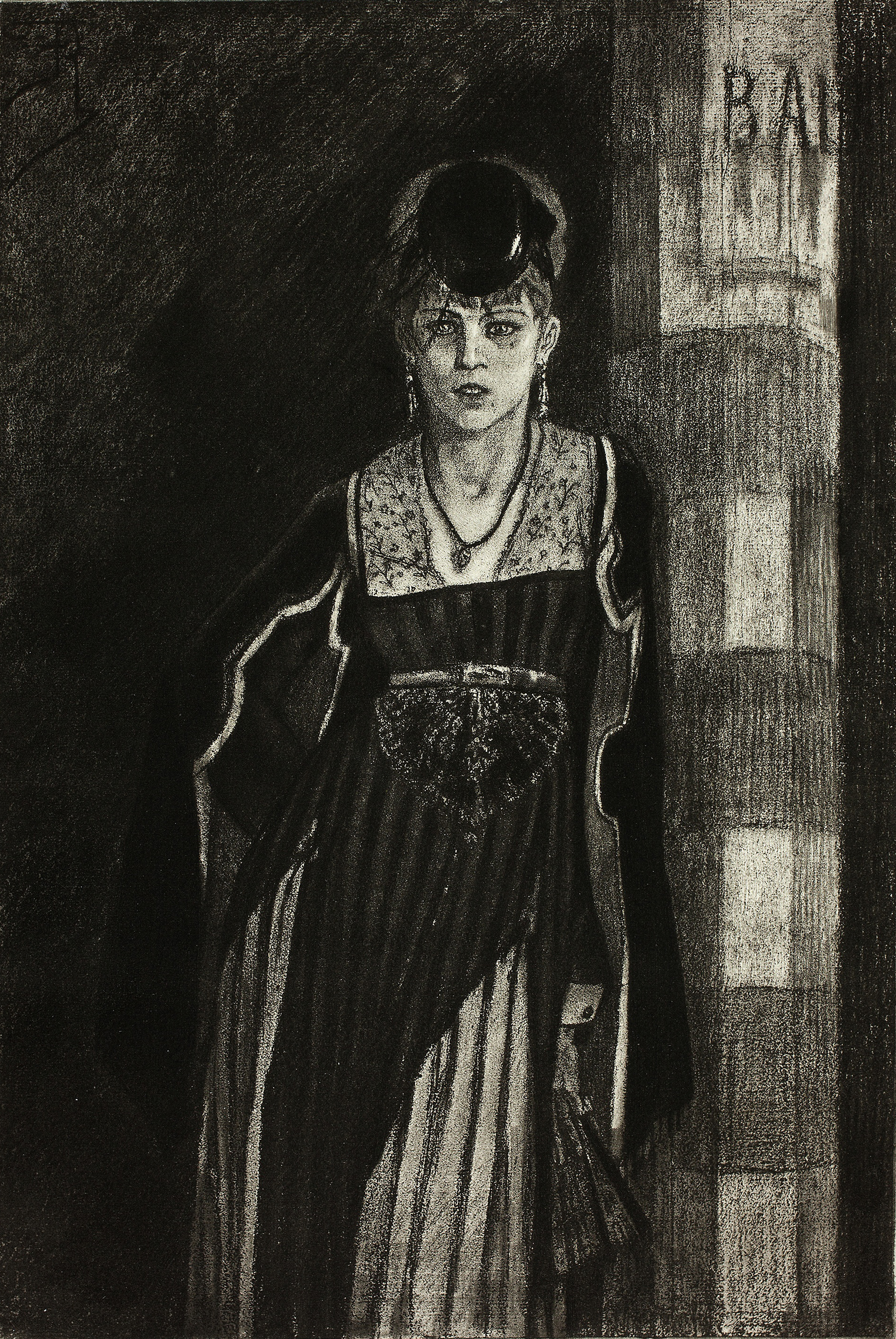
The Absinthe Drinker (1853–1898) heliogravure (335 × 225 mm) Art Institute of Chicago

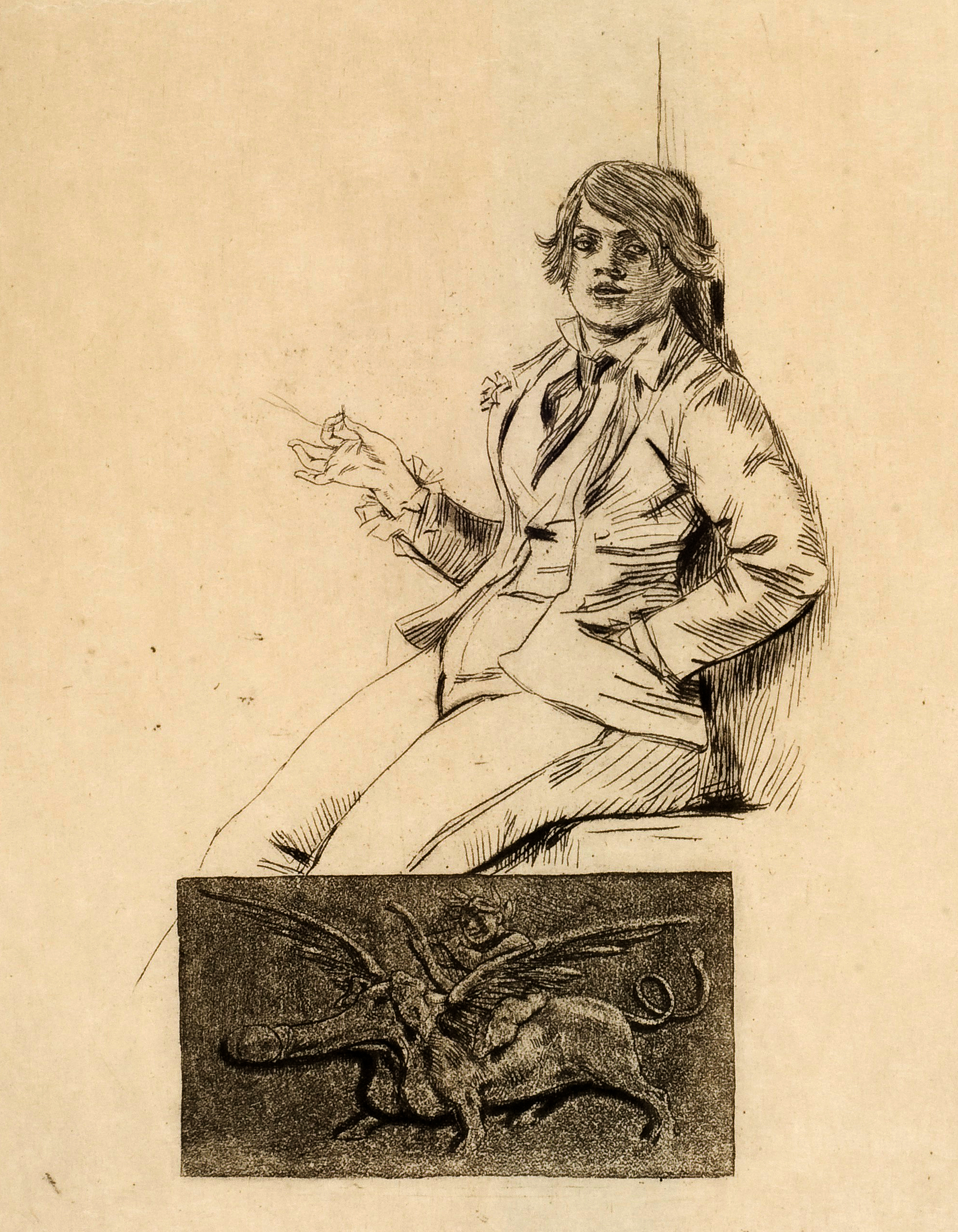
Mam'zelle Gavroche and Erotic Poetry (1879) heliogravure (24 x 18 cm) Michael C. Carlos Museum, Emory University, Atlanta

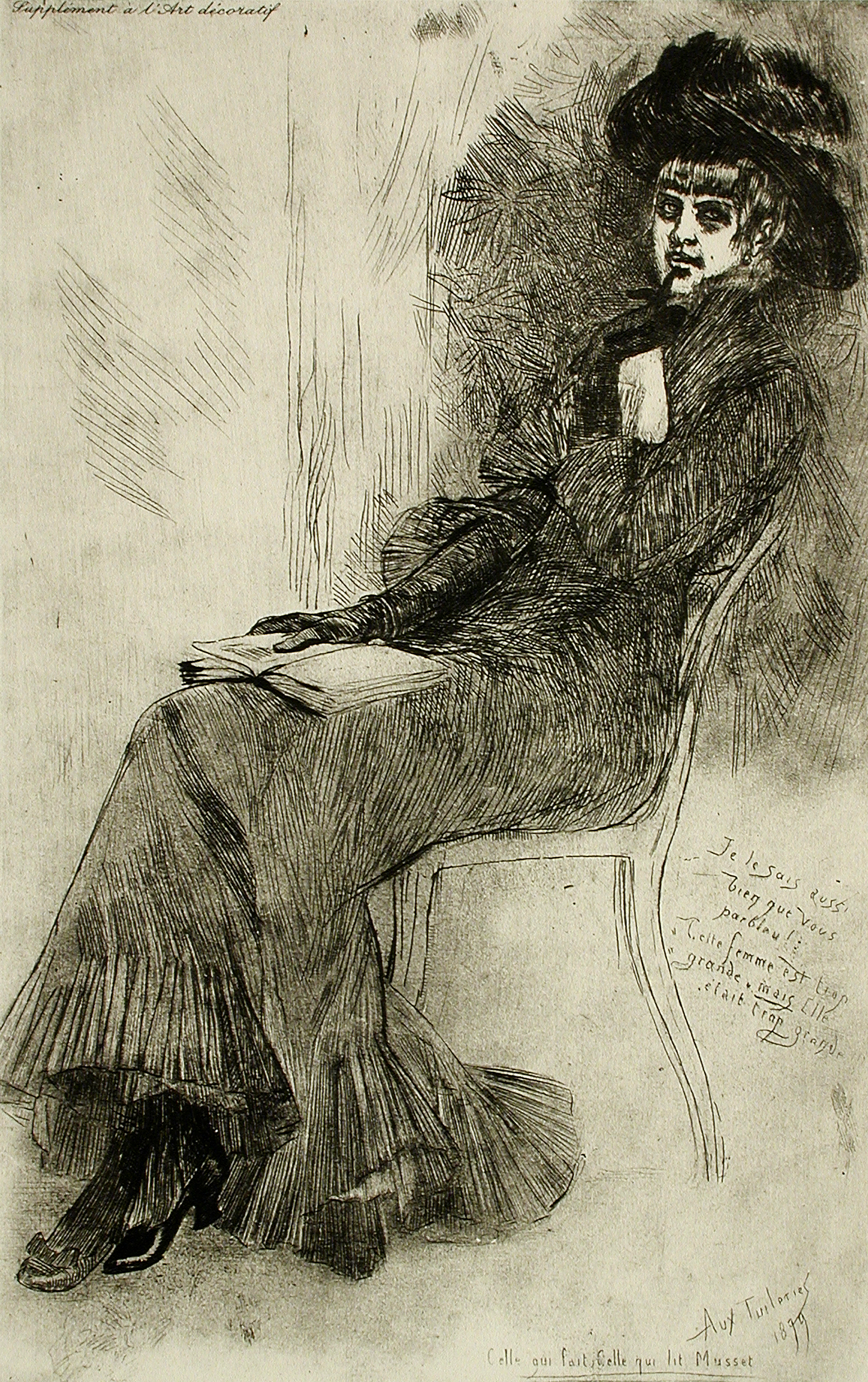
Celle qui fait 'Celle qui lit Musset' (1879) heliogravure (24.61 x 15.24 cm) Los Angeles County Museum of Art

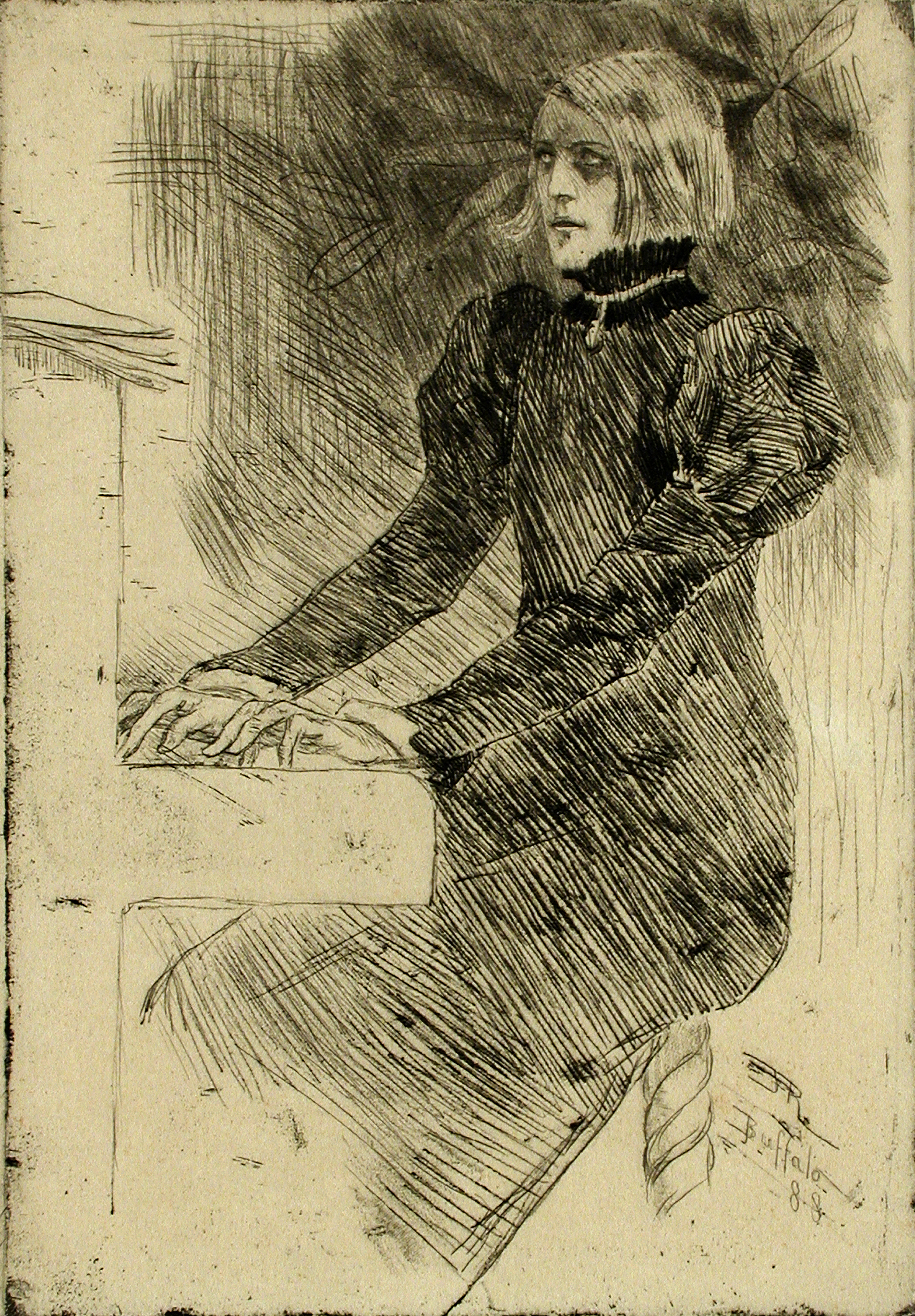
A Shaker Pianist (1888) etching (16.99 x 11.75 cm) Los Angeles County Museum of Art

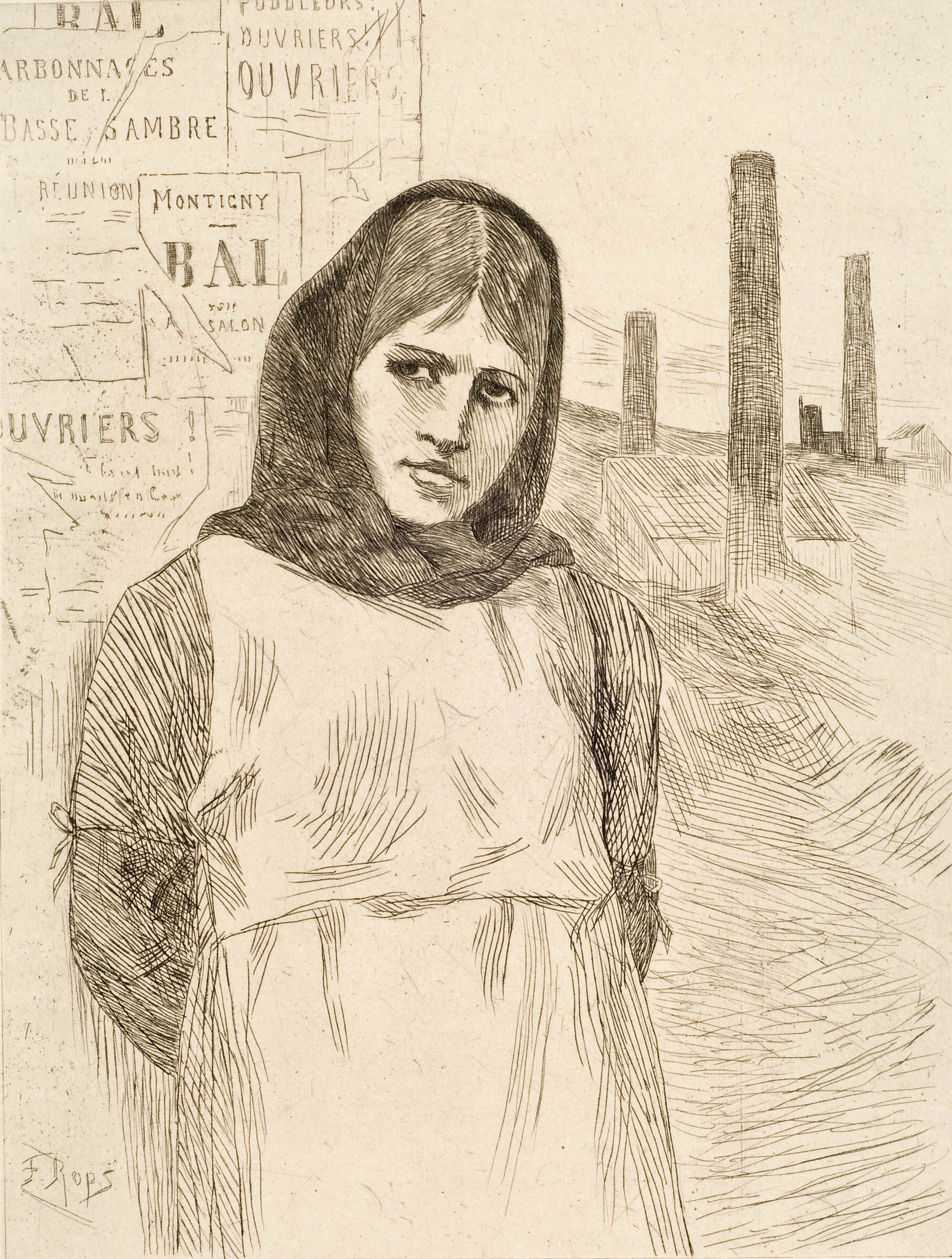
The Strike (1876) etching, drypoint (19.8 x 15.2 cm) Michael C. Carlos Museum, Emory University, Atlanta

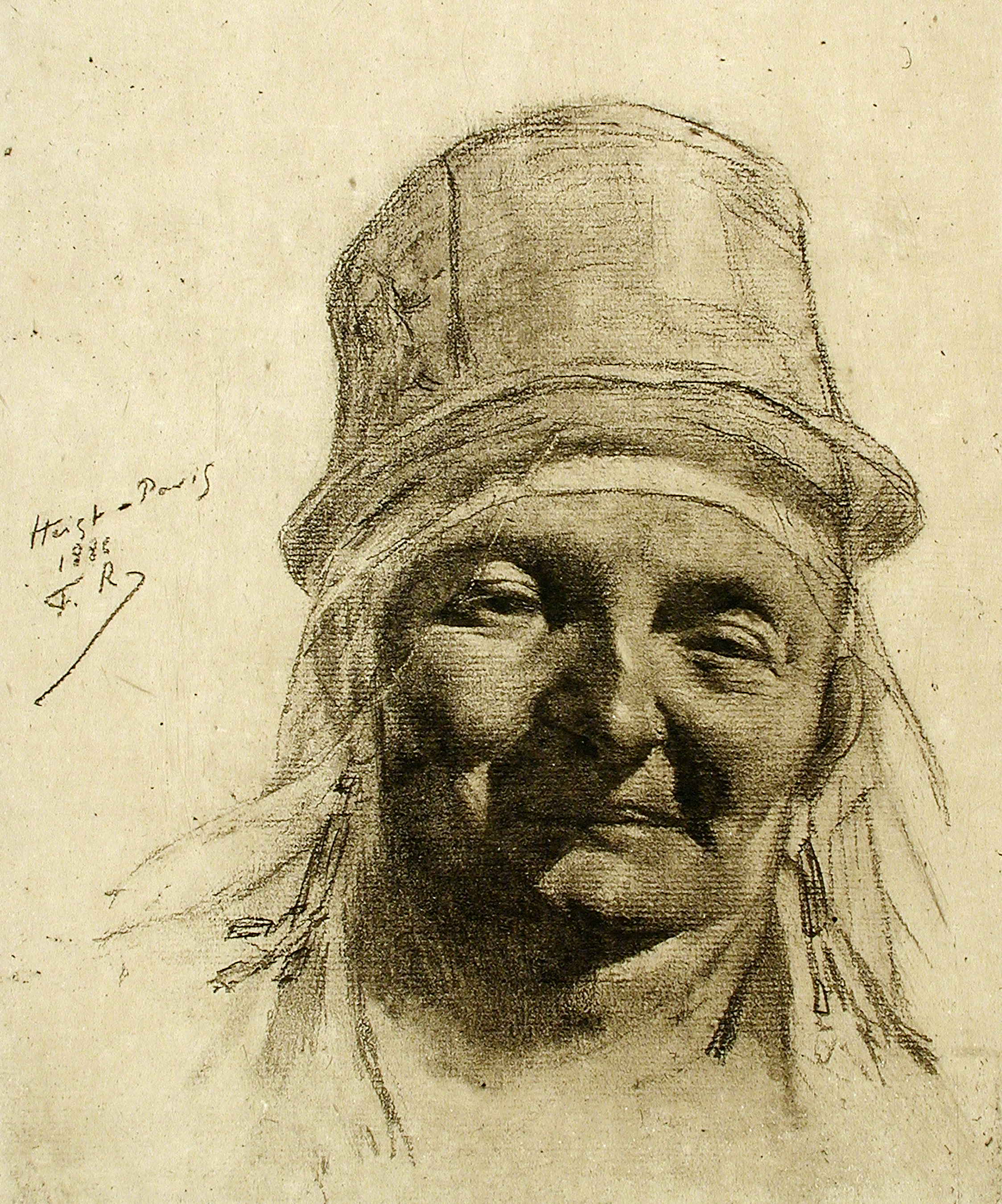
Head of Zealander (1886) soft-ground etching (19.69 x 23.65 cm) Los Angeles County Museum of Art

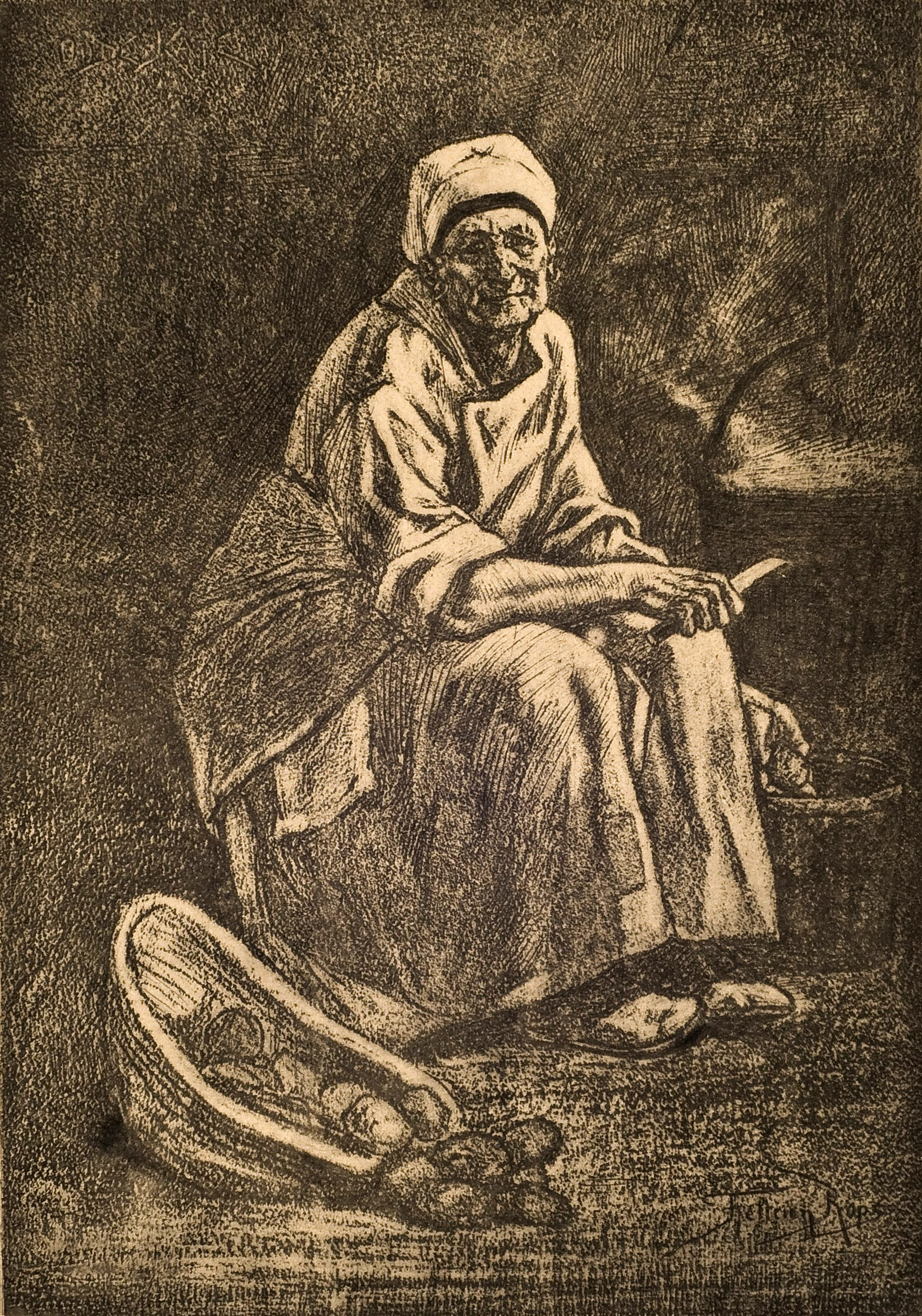
Old Kate (1895) heliogravure & roulette (25.9 x 19.5 cm) Michael C. Carlos Museum, Emory University, Atlanta

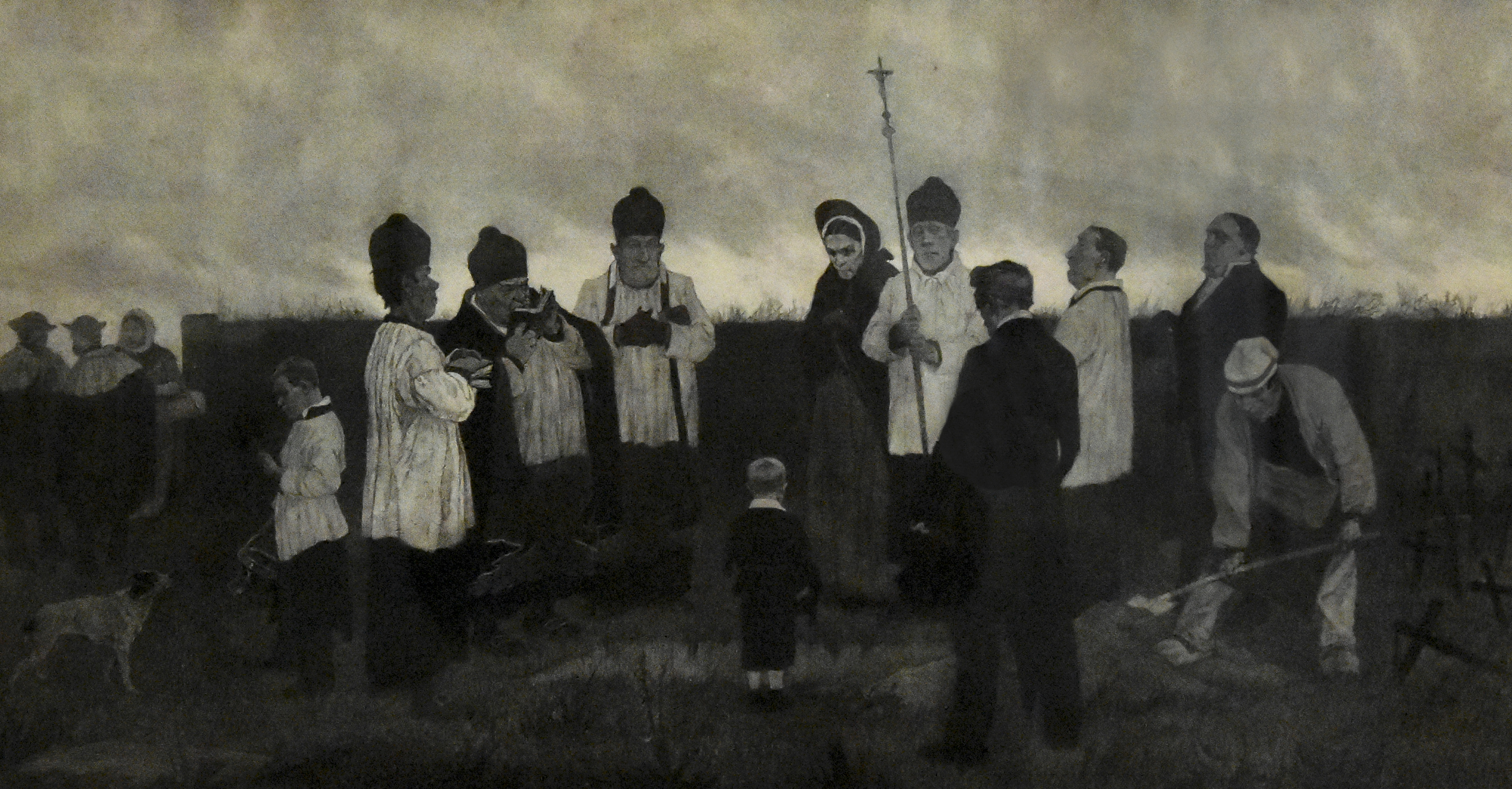
Funeral in the Walloon Country (1863) lithograph, Musée Félicien Rops, Namen, Belgium

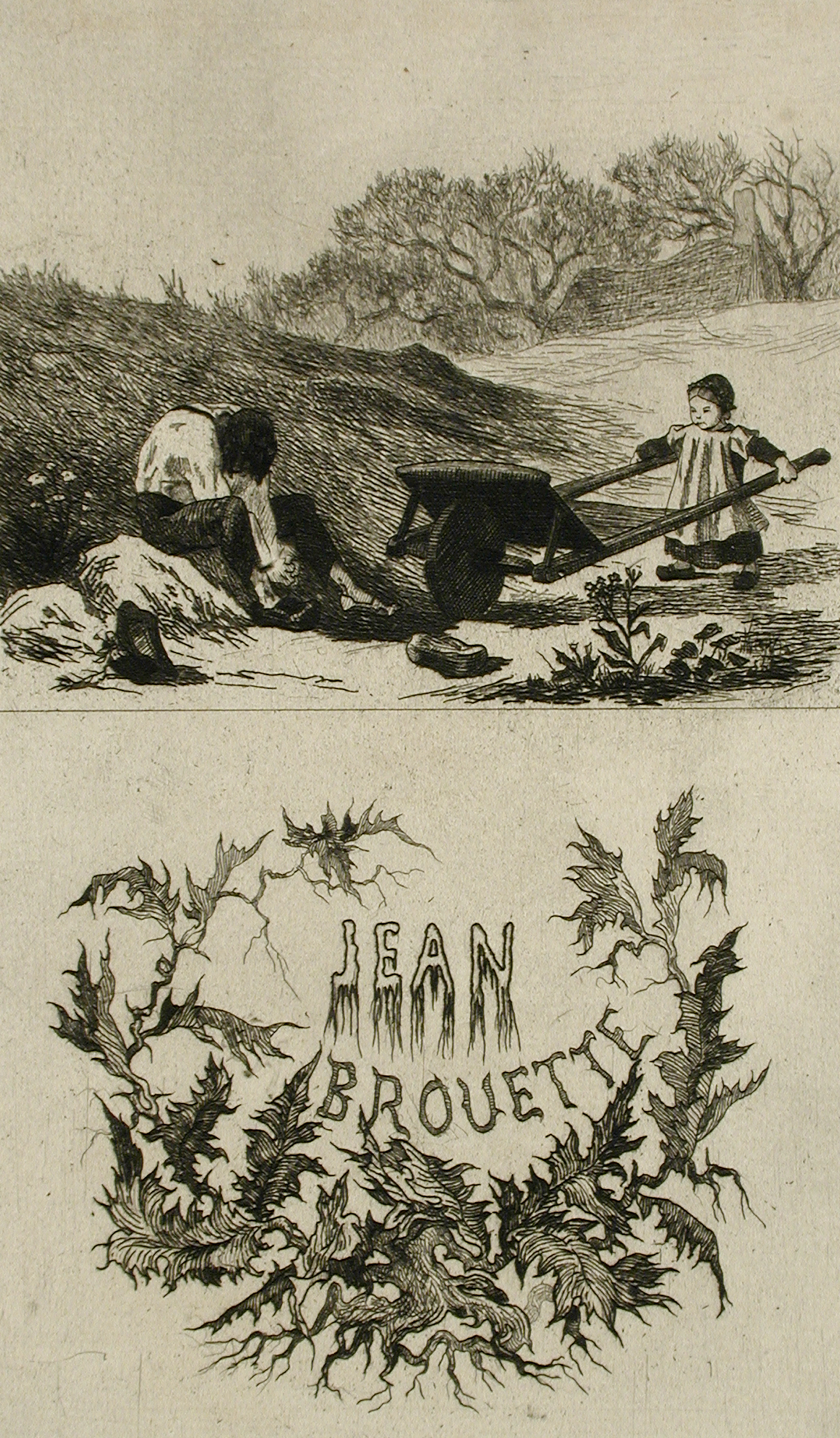
Jean Brouette (1875) etching (19.84 x 12.86 cm) Los Angeles County Museum of Art

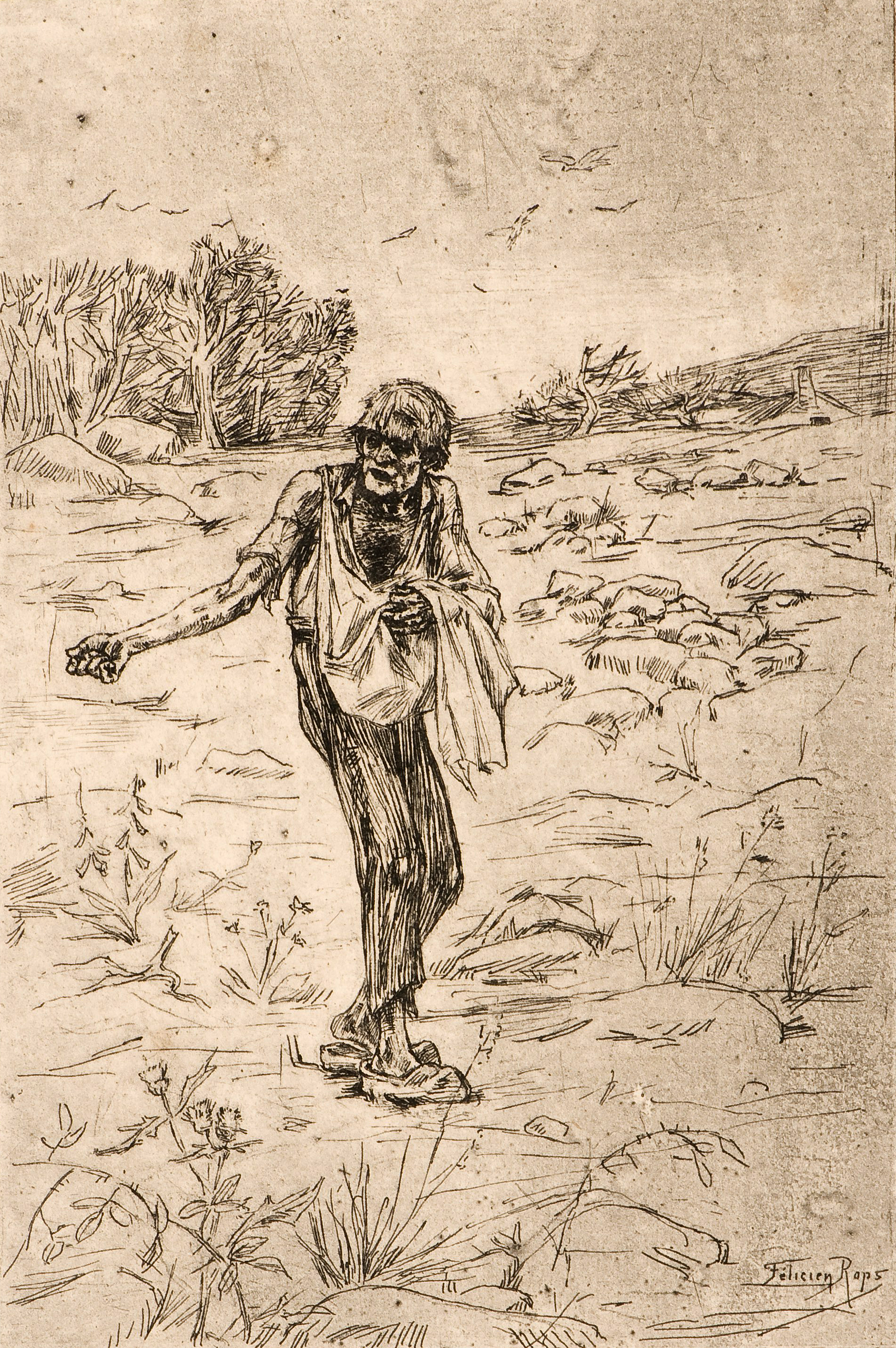
Parable of the Sower (no date) heliogravure, drypoint (16.3 x 11.4 cm) Michael C. Carlos Museum, Emory University, Atlanta

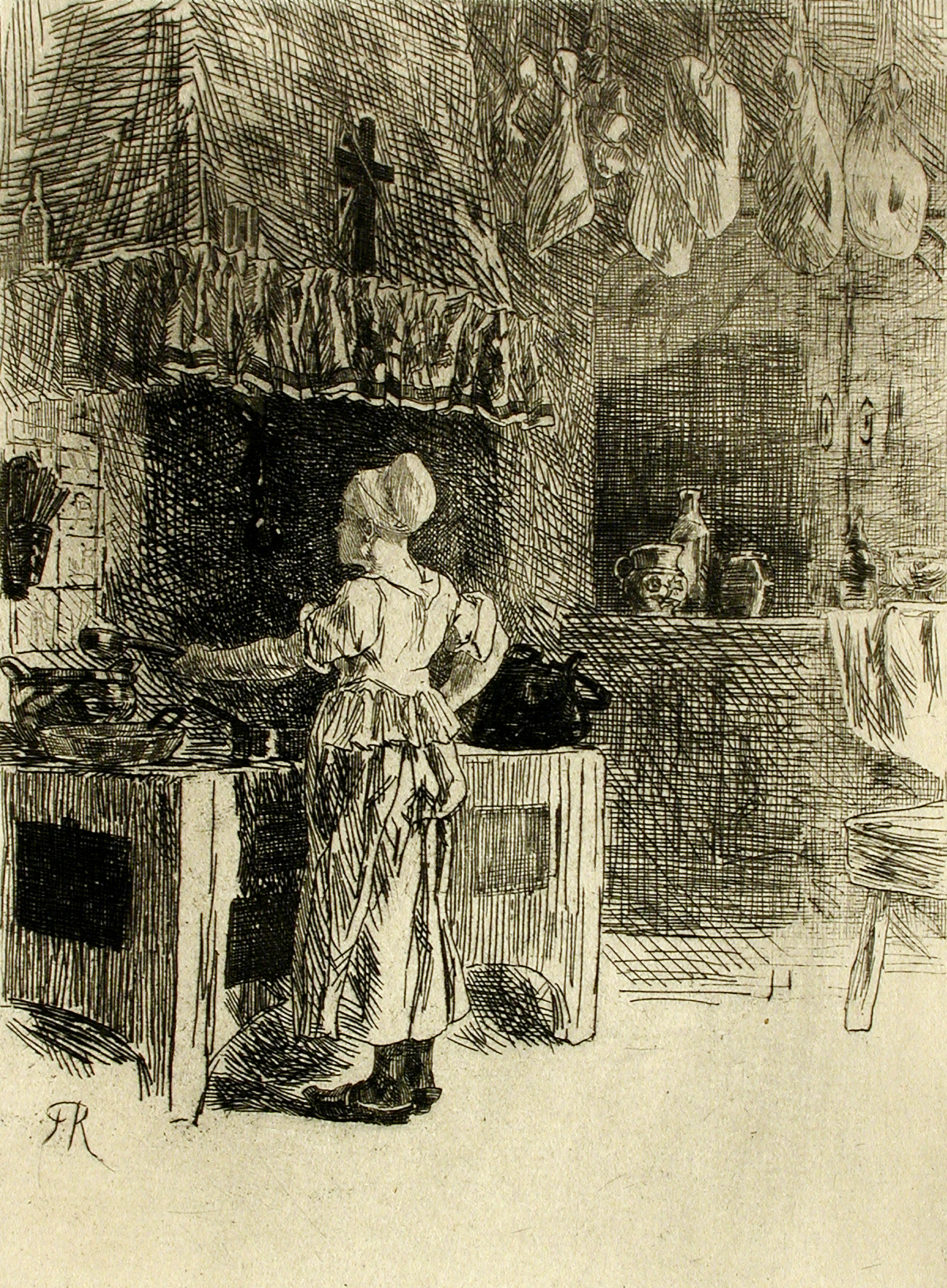
The Kitchen of the Artists' Inn, in Anseremme (no date) etching (19.05 x 13.81 cm) Los Angeles County Museum of Art

=== Les Sataniques and Les Diaboliques ===
As early as 1896, when a special tribute edition of the literary journal La Plume (No. 172, 15 June) was published honoring Rops, the illustrations he produced for d'Aurevilly's Les Diaboliques as well as an earlier series, Les Sataniques were often singled out and "placed at the top of the ropsian pantheon" and considered the "paradigm of the Ropsian work". Subsequent critics, historians, as well as his admirers among the general public have consistently regarded these prints as among the best examples of his illustrative oeuvre. Art historian Robert L. Delevoy wrote "His etchings for Les Diaboliques by Barbey d'Aurevilly are regarded as some of the best illustrative work ever done."

Les Sataniques (The Satanic) was a series of his own initiative, independent of his book illustrations and literary works. Dating from about 1882, there are a number of closely related drawings, watercolors, sketches, and other mixed media pieces, as well as prints in various states of development. He had hoped to do a large series and eventually publish them in the form of a book, but this never came to fruition. Ultimately a set of five heliogravures (based on five original drawings) were published, including: Satan semant l'ivraie (Satan Sowing Tare), L'enlèvement (The Abduction), Le Calvaire (The Calvary), L'idole (The Idol), and Le Sacrifice (The Sacrifice). The frontispiece of the cycle, Satan Sowing Tare, which appeared in several versions, was based on the Biblical Parable of the Tares which appears in Matthew 13:24-13:30. This series ranks among the more familiar and discussed images of his work. There is nothing in the dozens of references below to suggest that Rops was actively involved or a believer in Satanism, and his use of this subject was only symbolic or metaphoric.

==== Gallery III: Les Sataniques ====
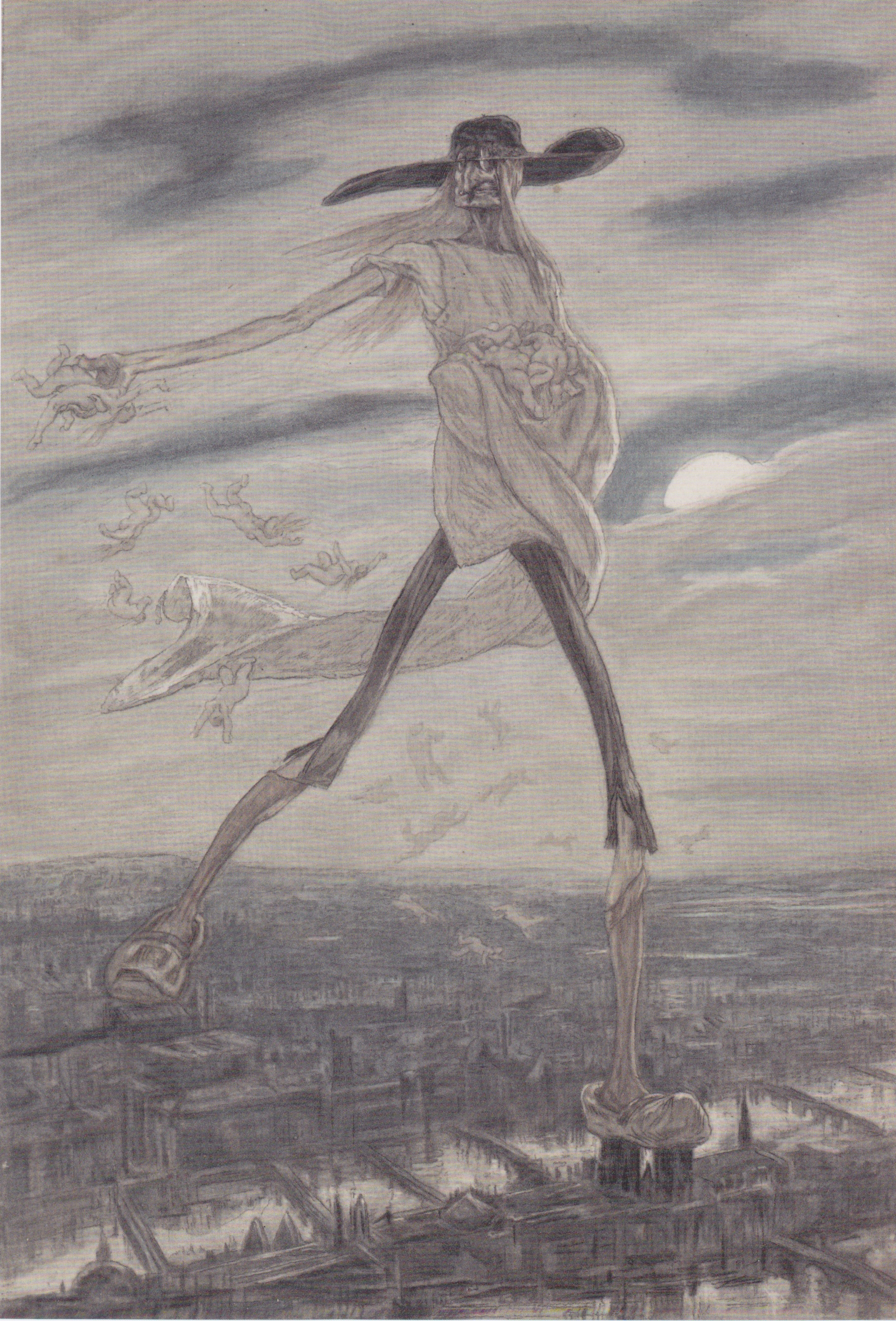
Satan Sowing Tares (1882) chromolithograph (30.4 x 21 cm) Musèe Félicien Rops

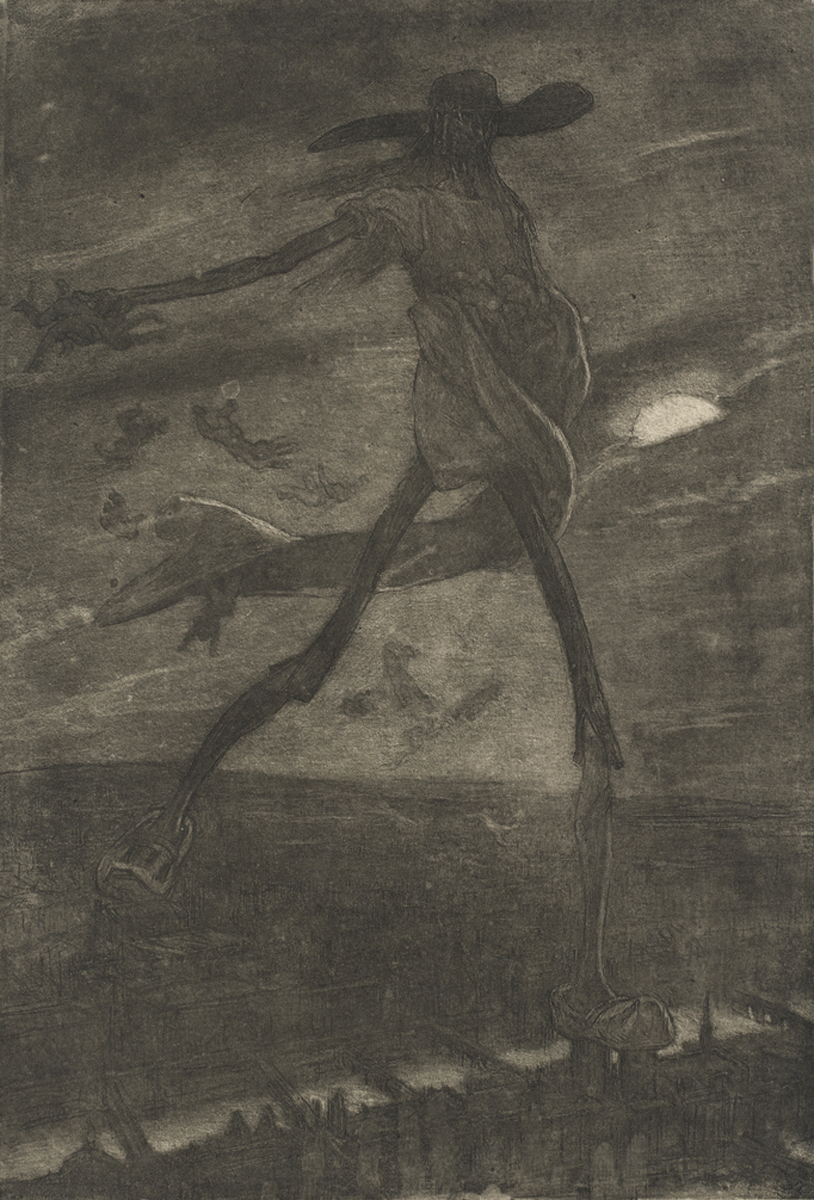
Satan Sowing Tare (1882) etching, aquatint (27.7 x 20.9 cm) National Gallery of Art, Washington, DC

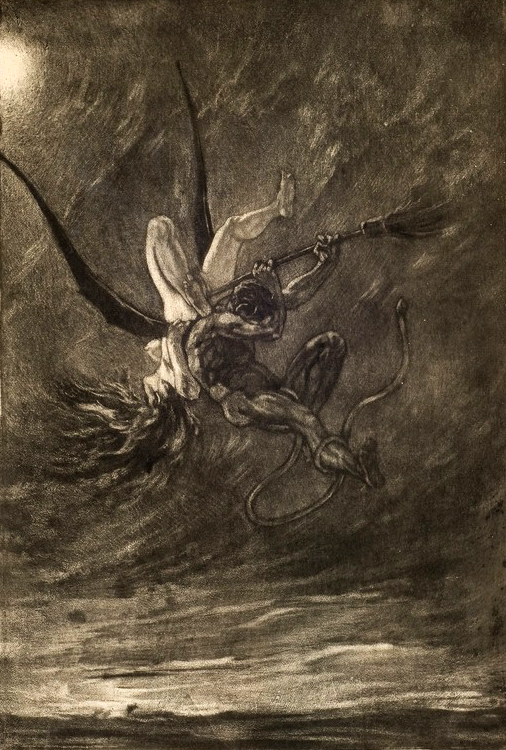
The Abduction (1882) heliogravure (27.8 x 20 cm) Michael C. Carlos Museum, Emory University, Atlanta

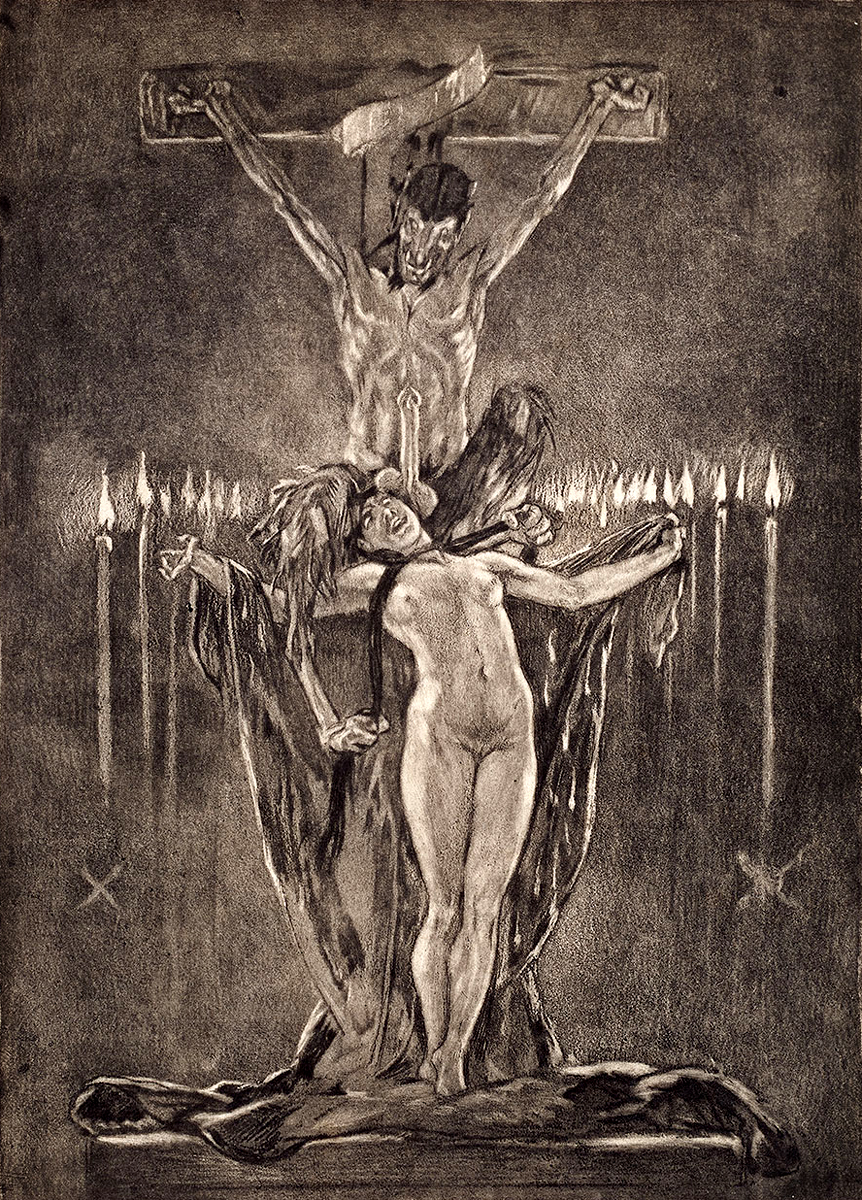
Le Calvaire (1882) heliogravure (ca. 27 x 20 cm) Museum De Reede, Antwerp

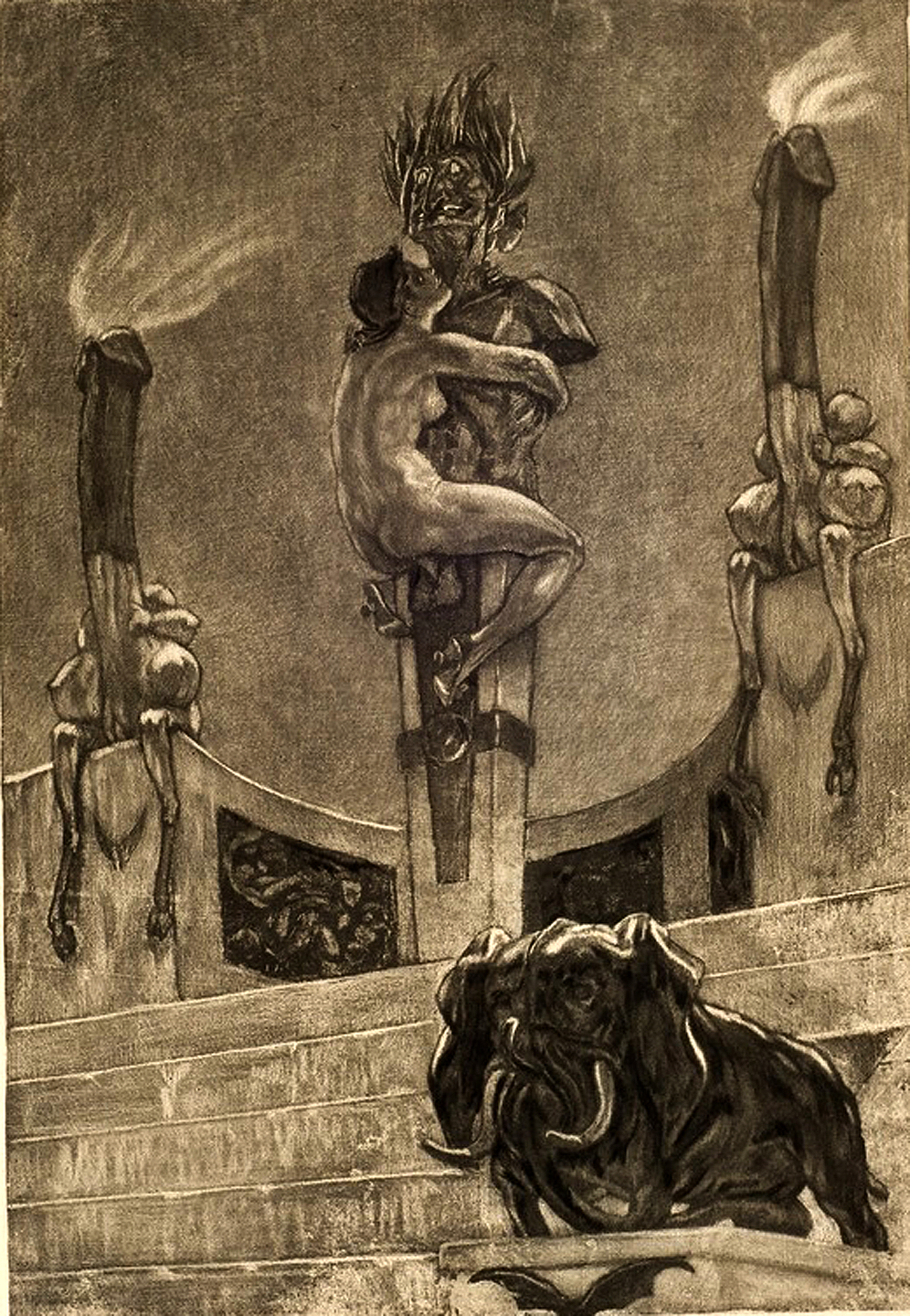
The Idol (1882) heliogravure (27.6 x 20 cm) Michael C. Carlos Museum, Emory University, Atlanta

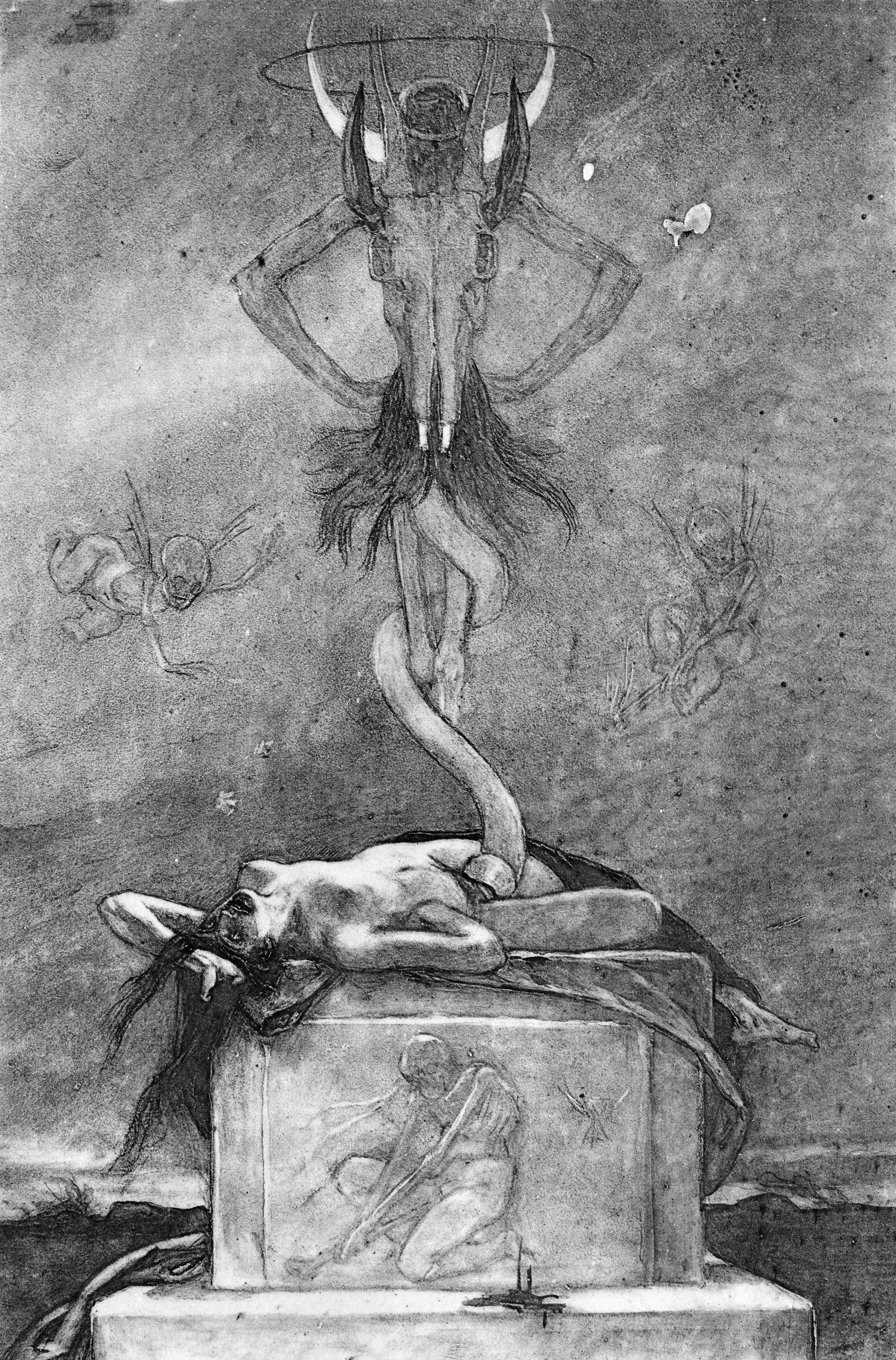
The Sacrifice (ca. 1882) soft ground etching, reproduced in heliogravure (27.6 x 20.3 cm) Metropolitan Museum of Art, New York

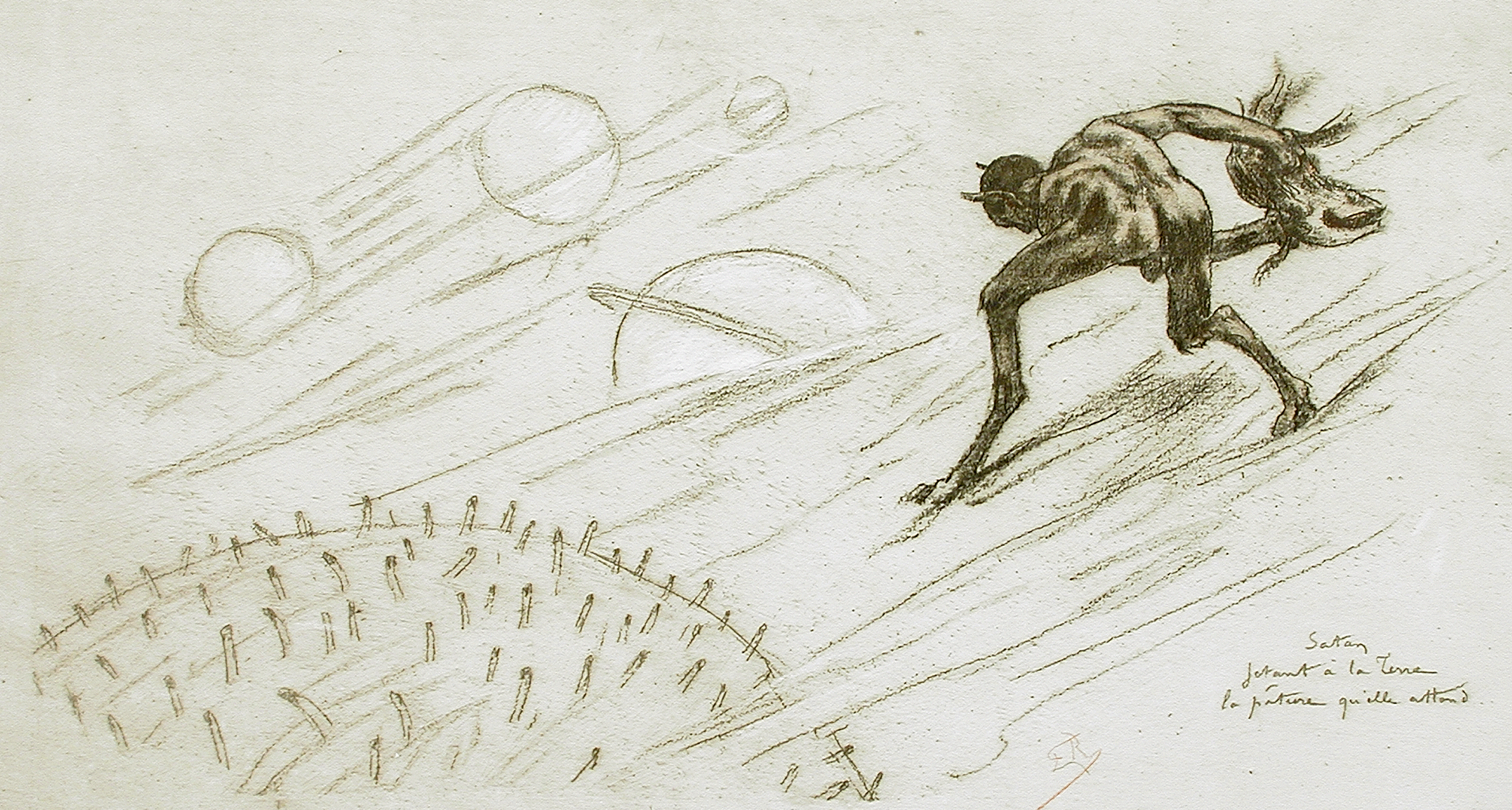
Satan Throwing to the World the Food She Deserves (no date) soft-ground etching (15.88 × 31.75 cm) Los Angeles County Museum of Art

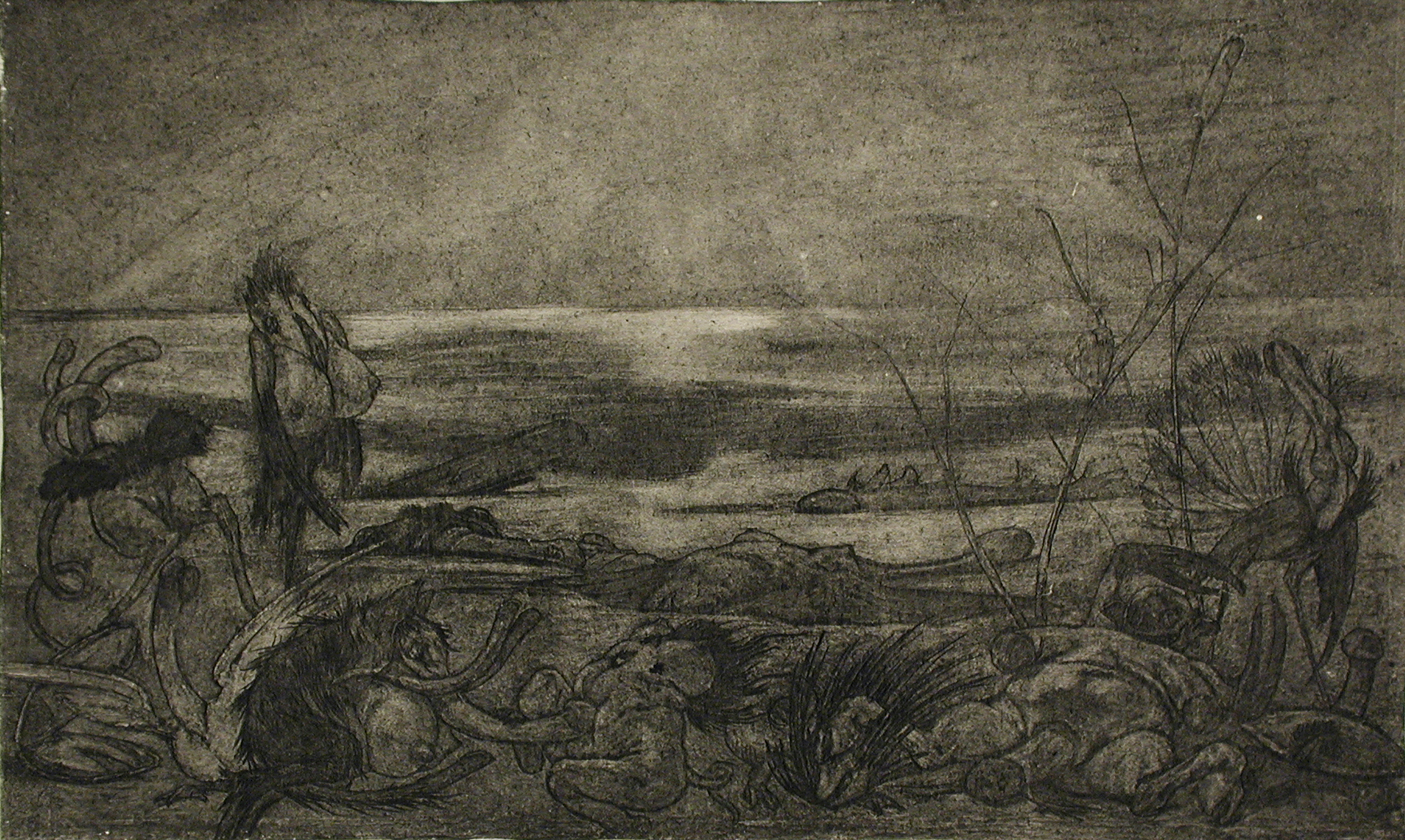
Genesis from Les Sataniques (ca. 1882) soft-ground etching (18.89 x 25.56 cm) Los Angeles County Museum of Art

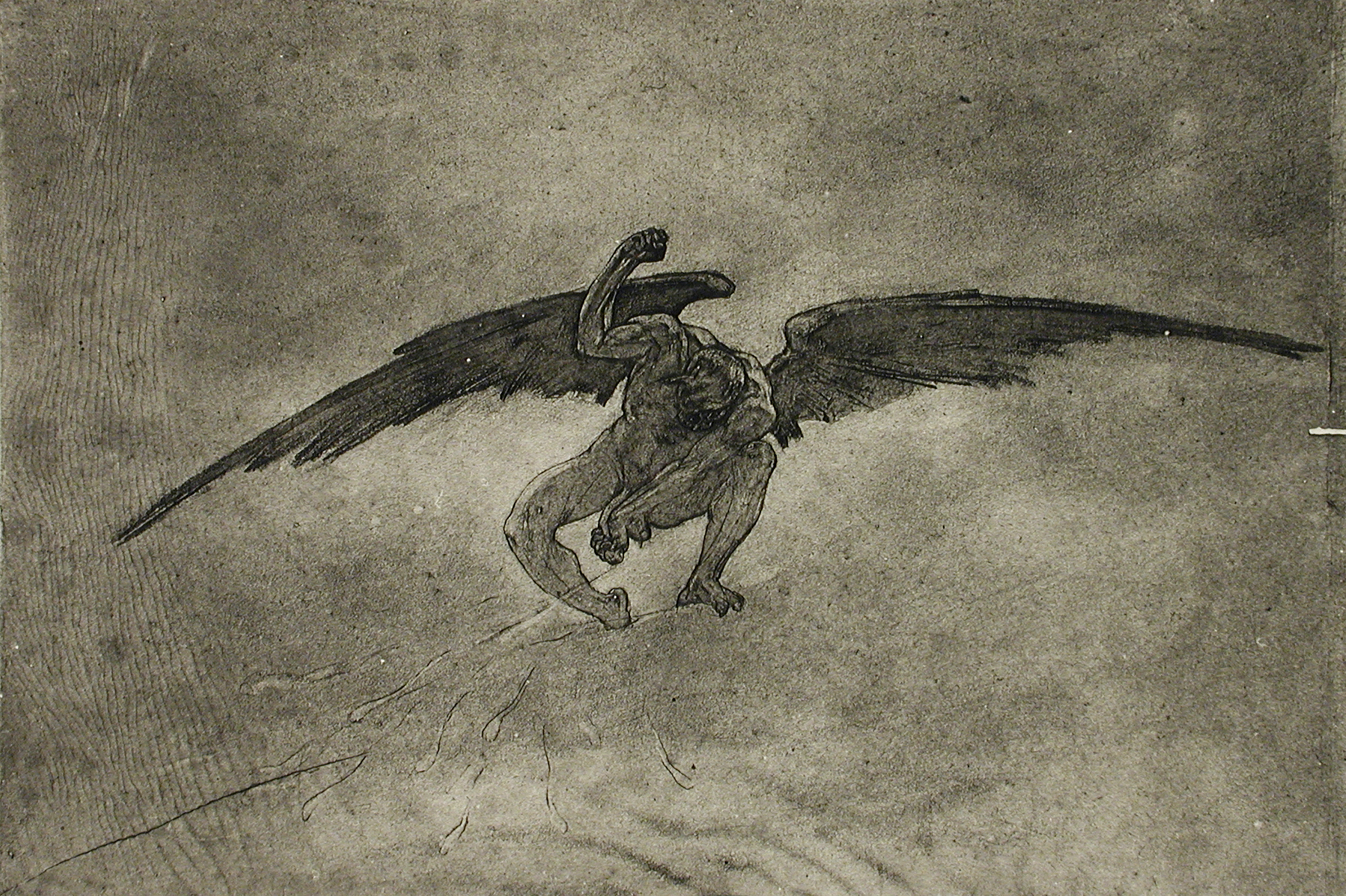
Satan Creating the Monsters from Les Sataniques (no date) soft-ground etching (13.1 x 19.6 cm) Los Angeles County Museum of Art

Les Diaboliques (The She-Devils) is a collection of six short stories by Jules Barbey d'Aurevilly that was first published in 1874. Each story is centered around a bored, bourgeois woman, usually involved in a crime of violent depravity or act of revenge. The book was an instant success and quickly sold out. The uproar caught the attention of the Public Prosecutor, the book was banned, the author and publisher were charged with insulting public morality, and set to be put on trial. However, with the aid of Léon Gambetta, a sympathetic statesman, a trial was avoided. Rops did not illustrate the first edition. Laws granting the freedom of the press in France were passed on 29 July 1881 and a second edition of the book was planned by the publisher, Alphonse Lemerre, who thought Rops was ideally suited to illustrate the new edition. Rops provided Lemerre with designs for the illustrations in the form of drawings, but the actual production of the etchings is believed to have been delegated to others. The first set of etchings is referred to as the "Lemerre format", or small boards [plates], and likely date from 1882 when the second edition of the book was published. However Delaporte, in his thesis, discuses a myriad of inconsistency involving the production and dates of the small etchings and suggest they could have appeared ca. 1882–1886.

Rops wrote in a letter to Jean-François Taelemans (8 April 1886) that he was unsatisfied and the "small boards do not say anything". He began a second set based on the original drawings using a heliogravure technique, which he then reworked by hand with aquatint, soft-ground varnish, drypoint, etc. The heliogravure prints gave Rops a greater ability to exhibit subtleties and nuances of light and shadow in the dark, nocturnal images. Apparently La Vengeance d'une Femme (The Vengeance of a Woman) was not reproduced in the heliogravure set. The second, heliogravure set, is referred to as the large boards. Like the small boards, the history of the production and dates of the large boards involve many inconsistencies, contradictions, and other issues, but date from ca.1887-1893. The Les Diaboliques illustrations includes nine prints: the frontispiece Le Sphinx (The Sphinx); a prescript La Prostitution et la folie dominant le monde (Prostitution and Madness Rule the World); an illustration for each chapter, Le Rideau Cramoisi (The Crimson Curtain); Le plus bel amour de Don Juan (The Greatest Love of Don Juan); Le bonheur le dans le crime (Happiness in Crime); À un dîner d'athées (At a Dinner of Atheists); Le Dessous de Cartes d'une Partie de Whist (Beneath the Cards in a Game of Whist); La Vengeance d'une Femme (The Vengeance of a Woman); and a postscript La Femme et la folie dominant le monde (Woman & Madness Rule the World).

The print of The Greatest Love of Don Juan bears a striking similarity to Edvard Munch's famous painting Puberty painted in 1894. As early as 1894, with the first publication ever devoted to Munch, comparisons have been made. Munch denied having been influenced by Rops's etching, and said his painting was a copy of another painting he had made in the mid-1880s and "that this earlier version had been lost in a studio fire." Nonetheless, art critics and historians have consistently noted the similarities.

==== Gallery IV:Les Diaboliques ====
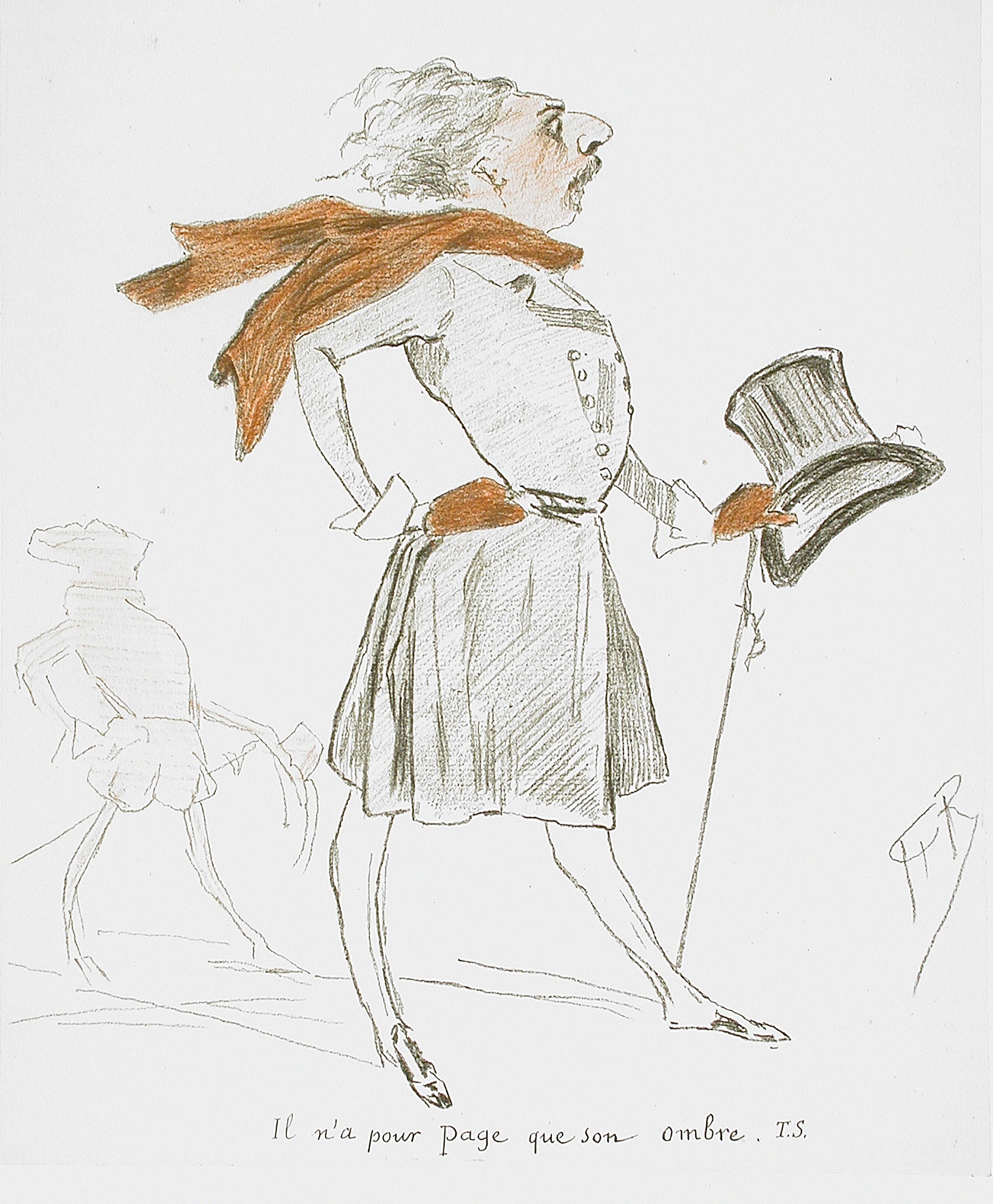
Caricature of Barbey d'Aurevilly (no date) hand-colored lithograph (27.31 x 22.86 cm) Los Angeles County Museum of Art

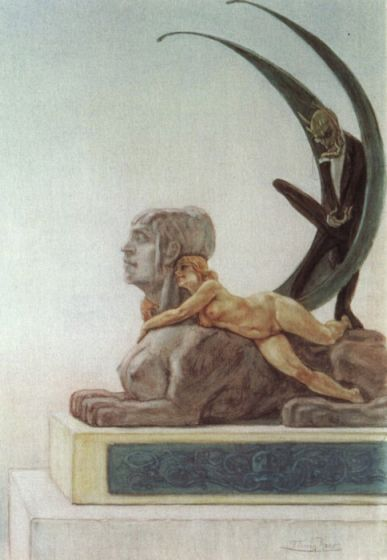
The Sphinx, illustration for Les Diaboliques by Jules Barbey d'Aurevilly (1879) pencil & watercolor (25 x 18 cm) Brussels

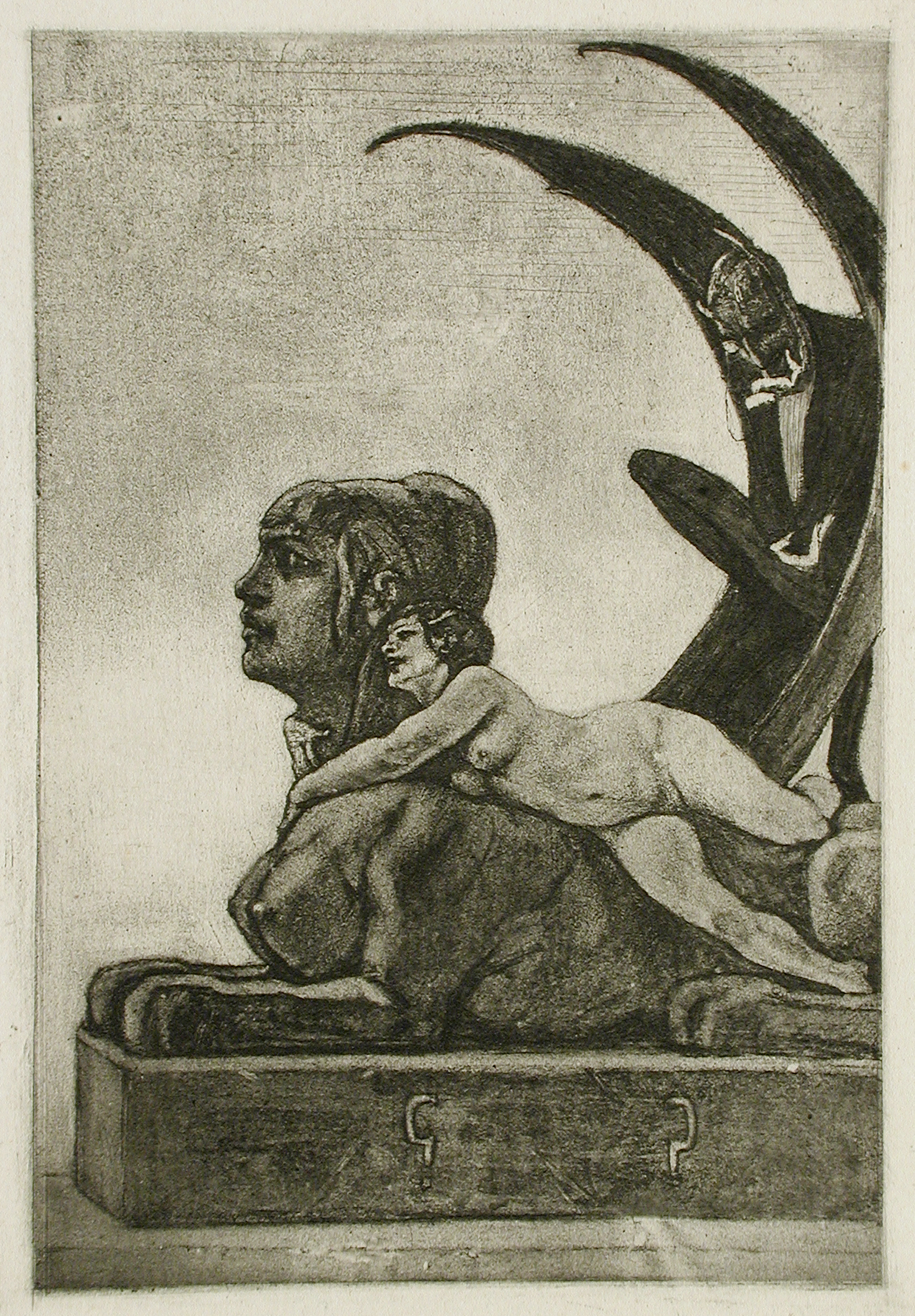
The Sphinx (ca.1887-1893) heliogravure, soft-ground etching (11.75 x 7.94 cm) Los Angeles County Museum of Art

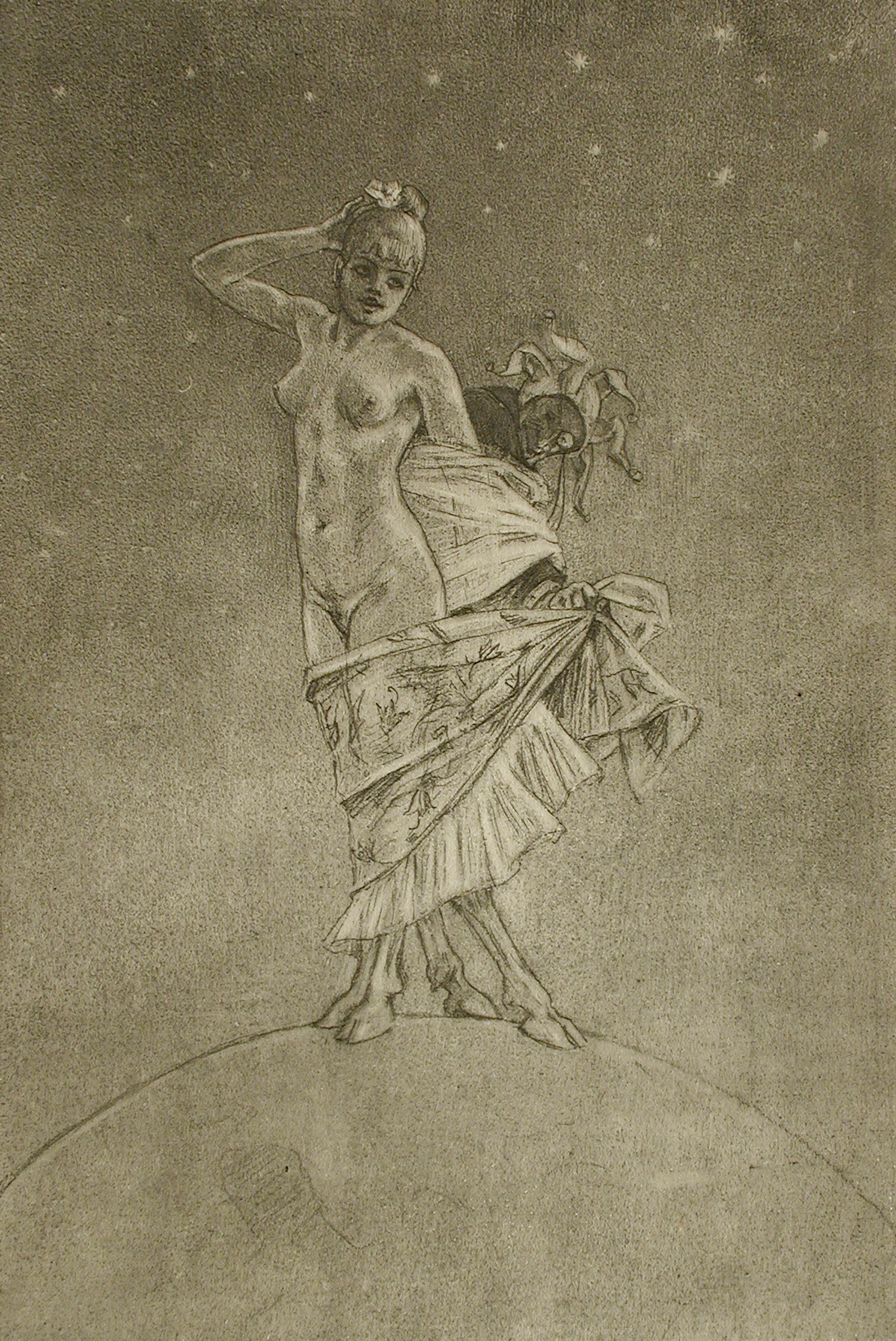
Prostitution and Madness Rule the World (ca.1887-1893) heliogravure, soft-ground etching (24 x 16 cm) L.A. County Museum of Art

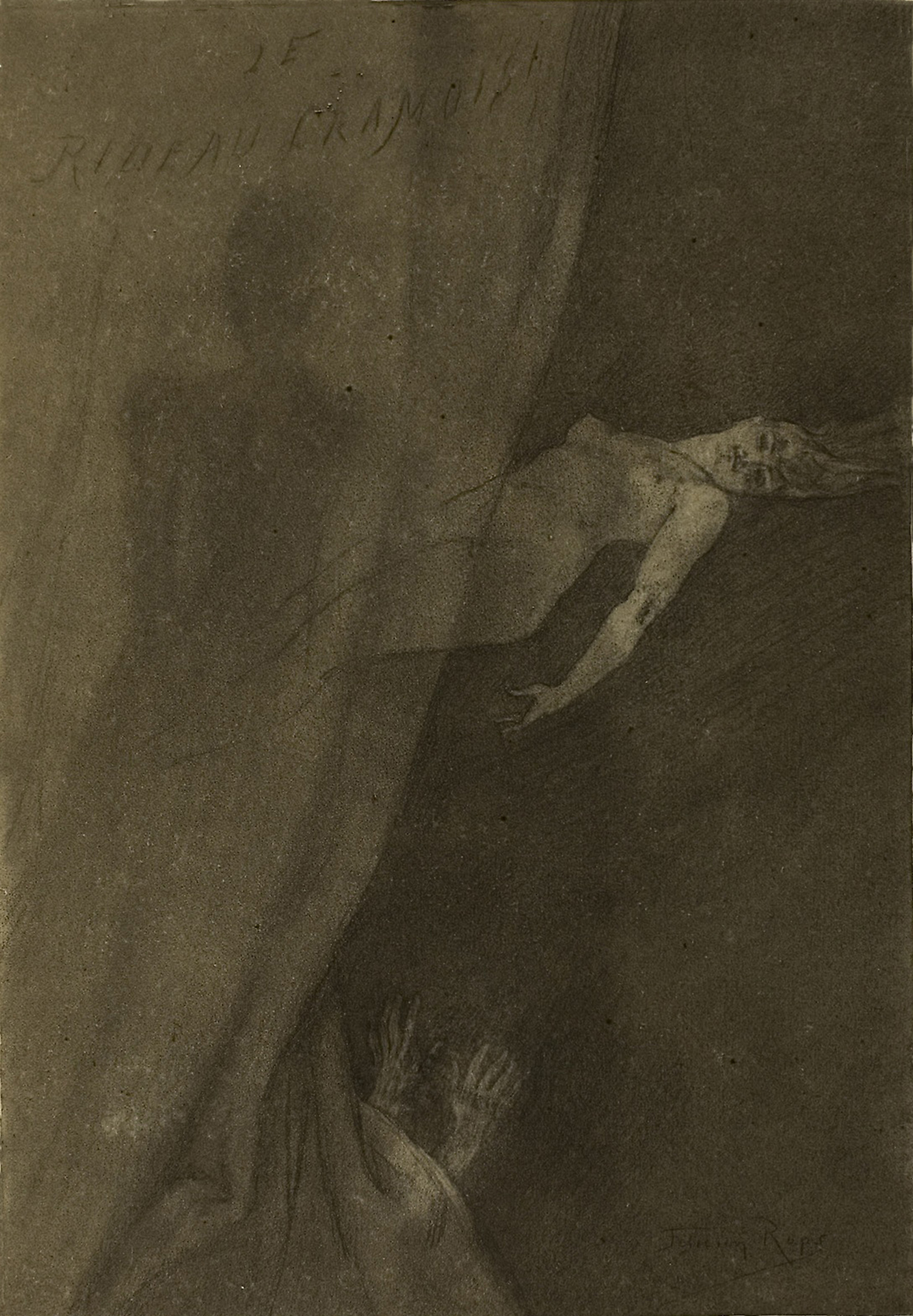
The Crimson Curtain (ca. 1887–93) heliogravure, aquatint and soft varnish (23.7 × 16.5 cm) Art Institute of Chicago

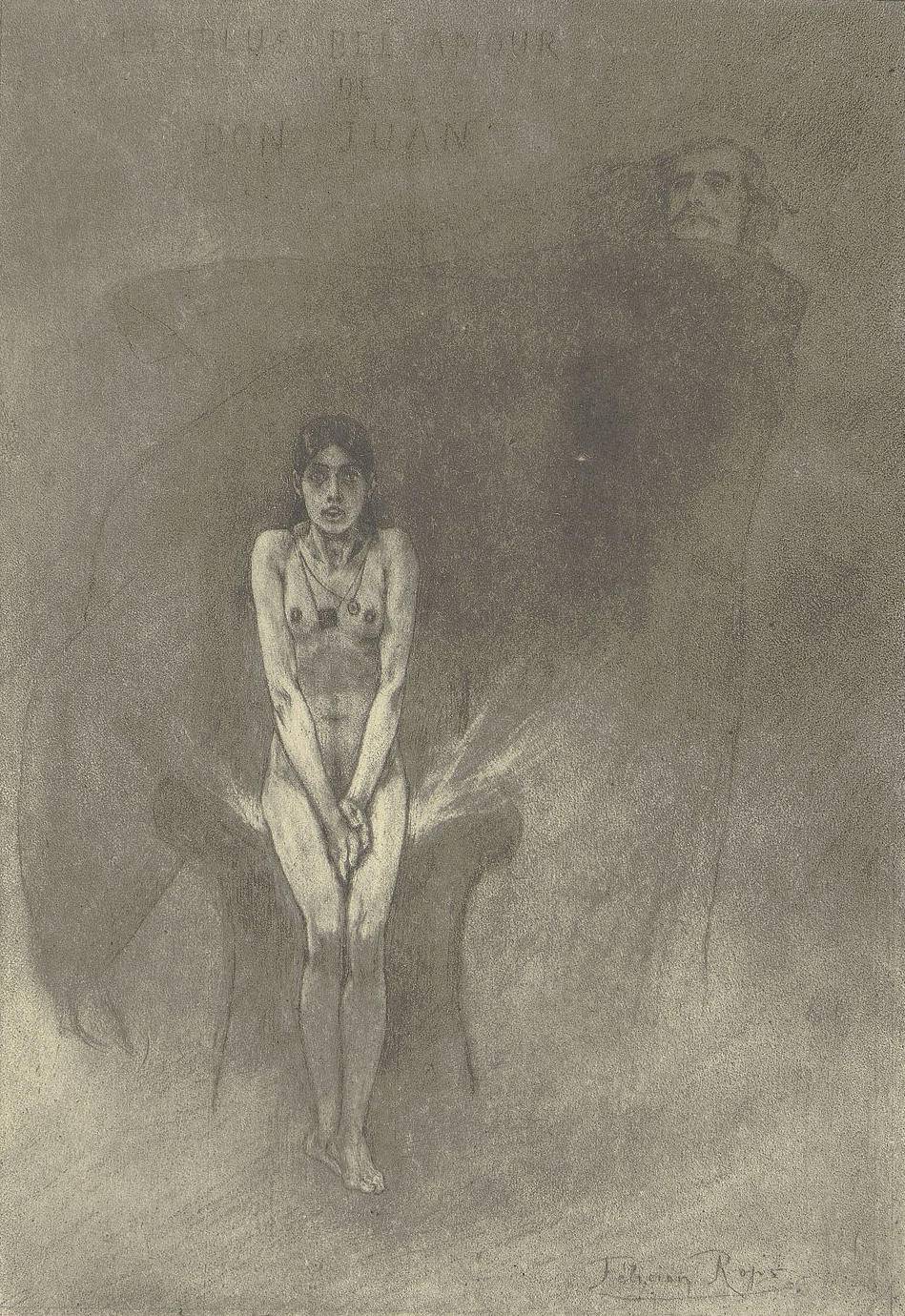
The Greatest Love of Don Juan (ca. 1887–93) heliogravure, etching, drypoint, aquatinte (23.5 x 16.2 cm) Royal Library of Belgium

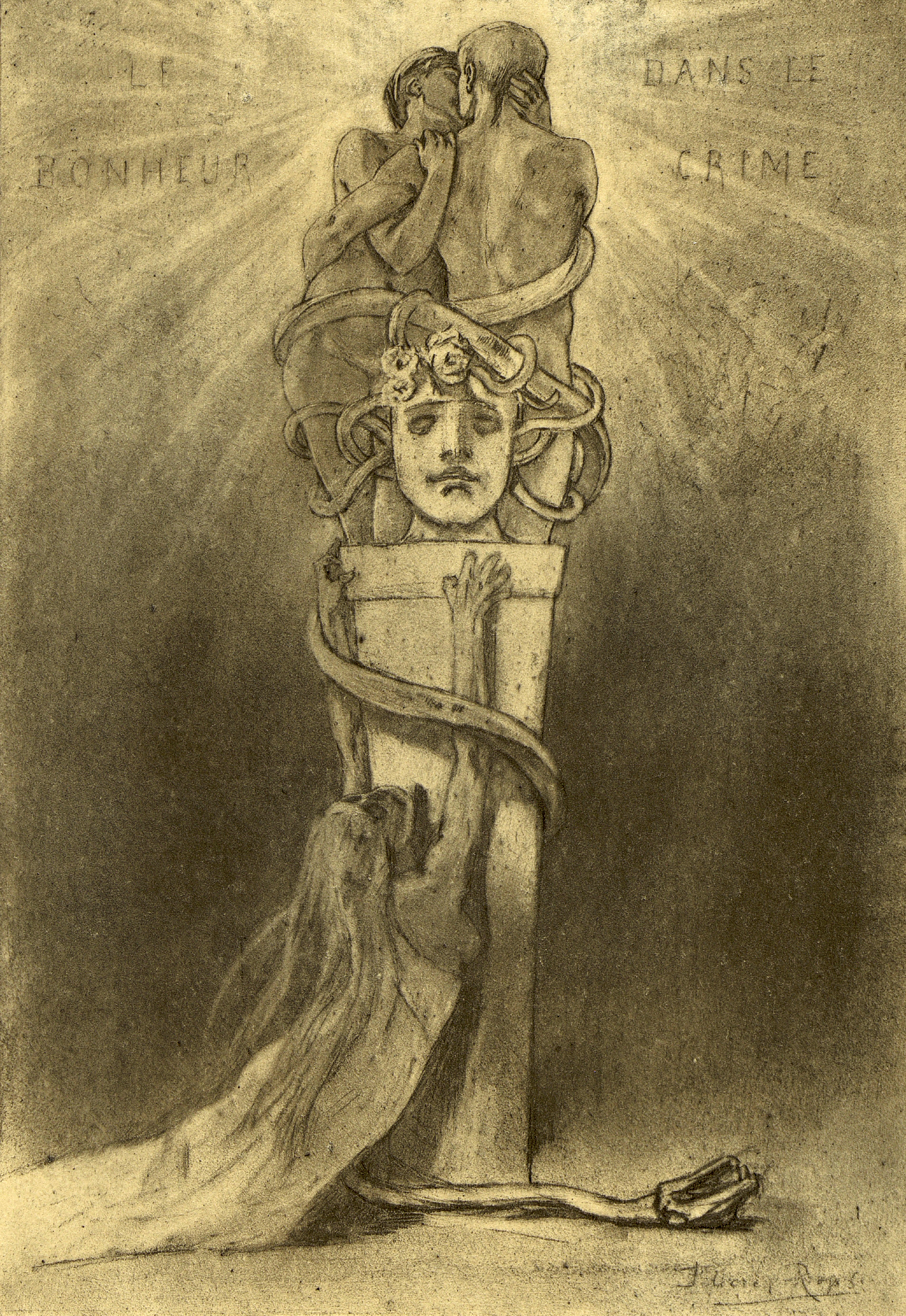
Happiness in Crime (ca. 1887–93) heliogravure, etching, dry point, aquatint (23.8 x 16.5 cm) Royal Library of Belgium

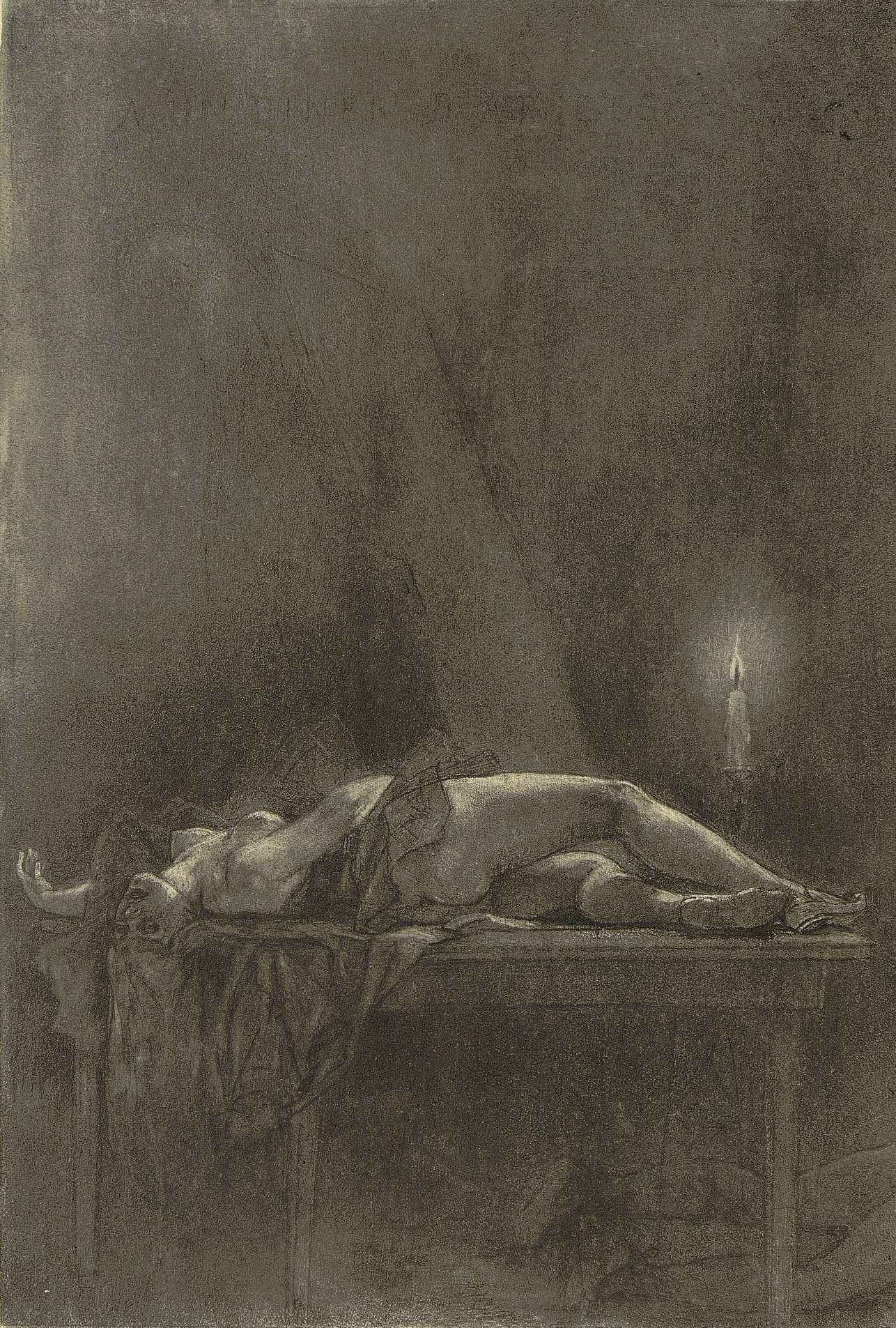
At a Dinner of Atheists (ca. 1887–93) heliogravure, aquatint, soft-ground varnish (24.8 x 16.6 cm) Royal Library of Belgium

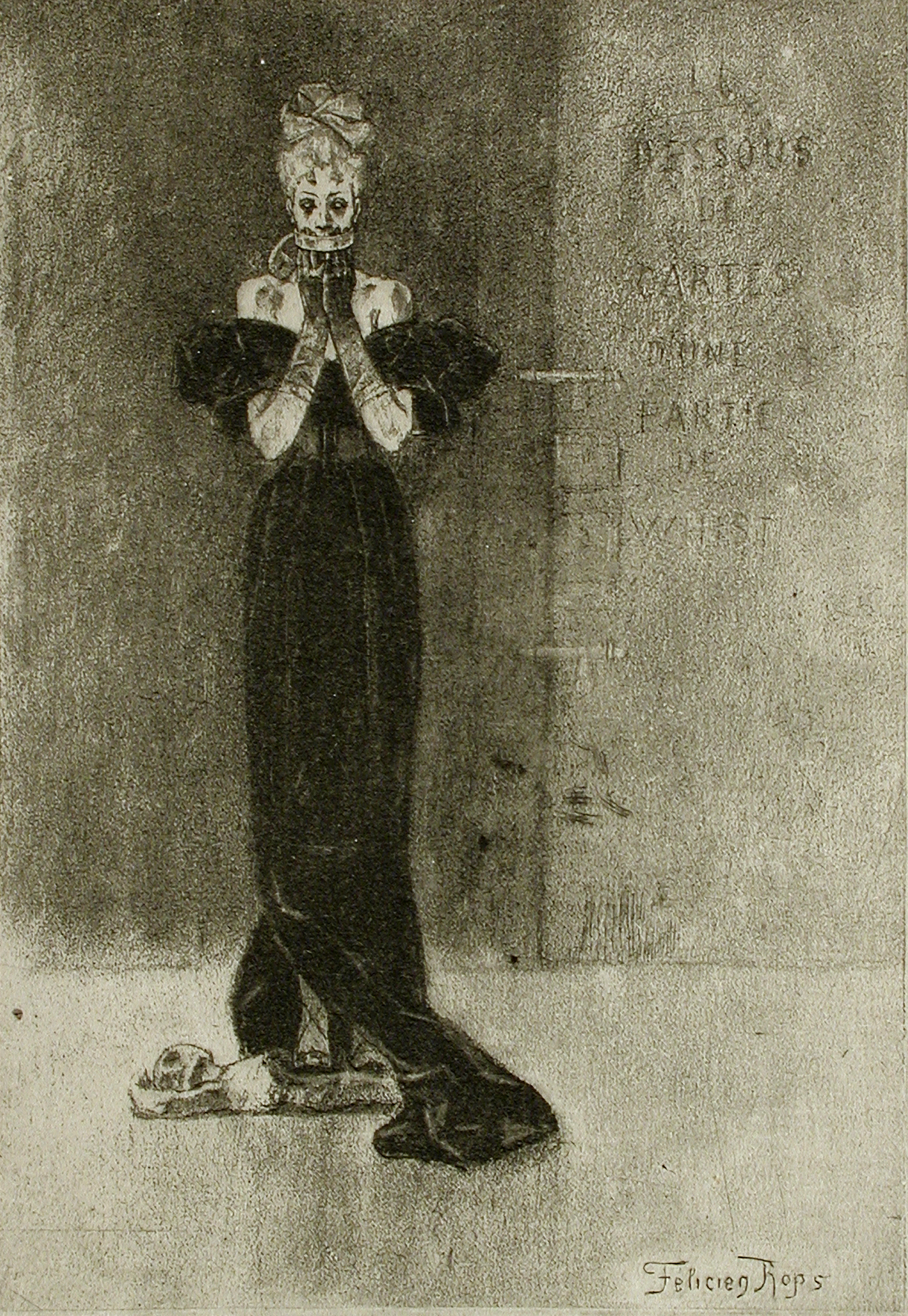
Beneath the Cards in a Game of Whist (ca. 1887–93) heliogravure (24.2 x 16.3 cm) Los Angeles County Museum of Art

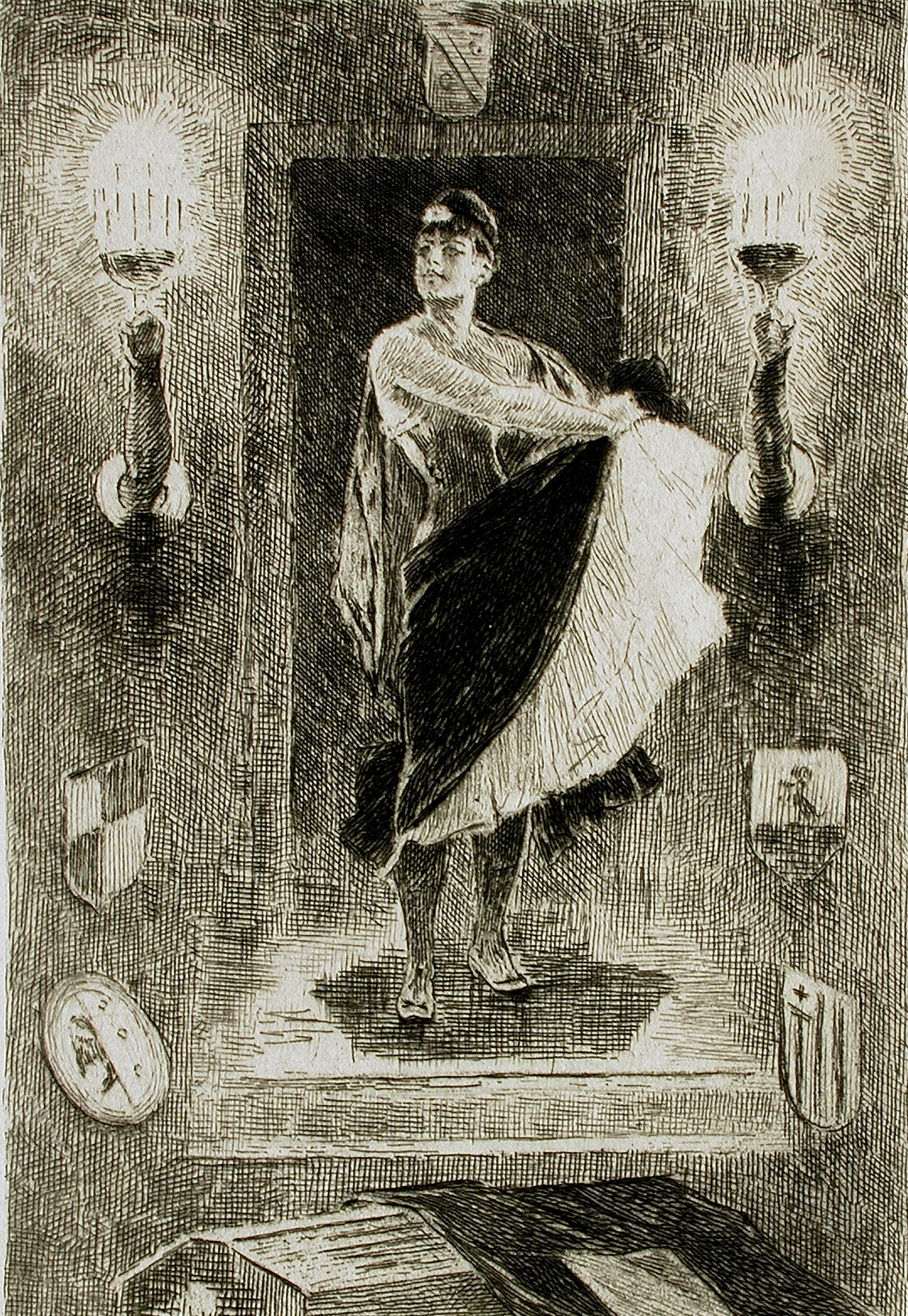
The Vengeance of a Woman (c. 1882–1886) etching (12.38 x 9.05 cm) Los Angeles County Museum of Art

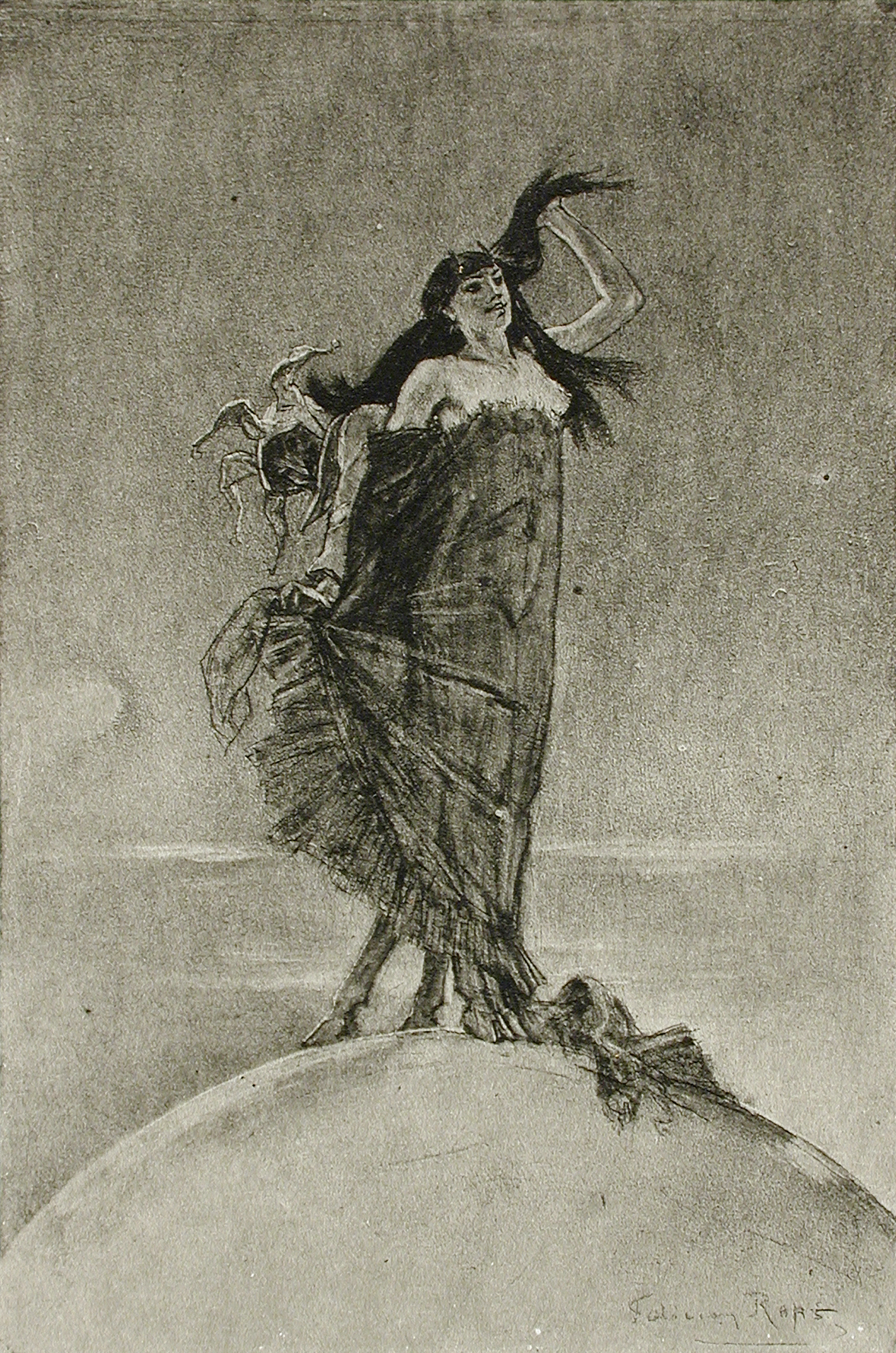
Woman & Madness Rule the World (ca. 1887–93) heliogravure (24.2 x 16.3 cm) Los Angeles County Museum of Art

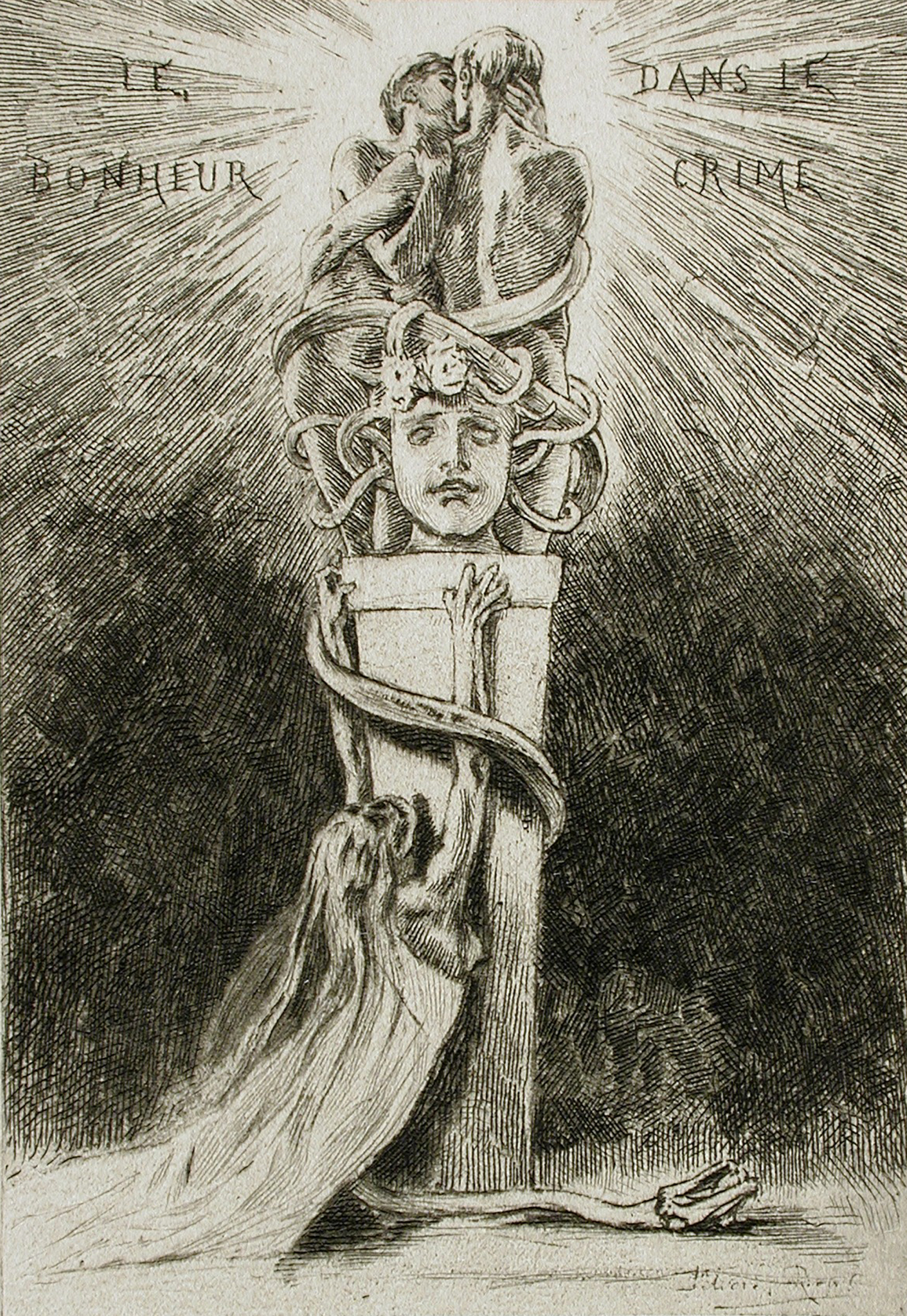
Happiness in Crime (1882) etching (12.38 x 9.05 cm) Los Angeles County Museum of Art

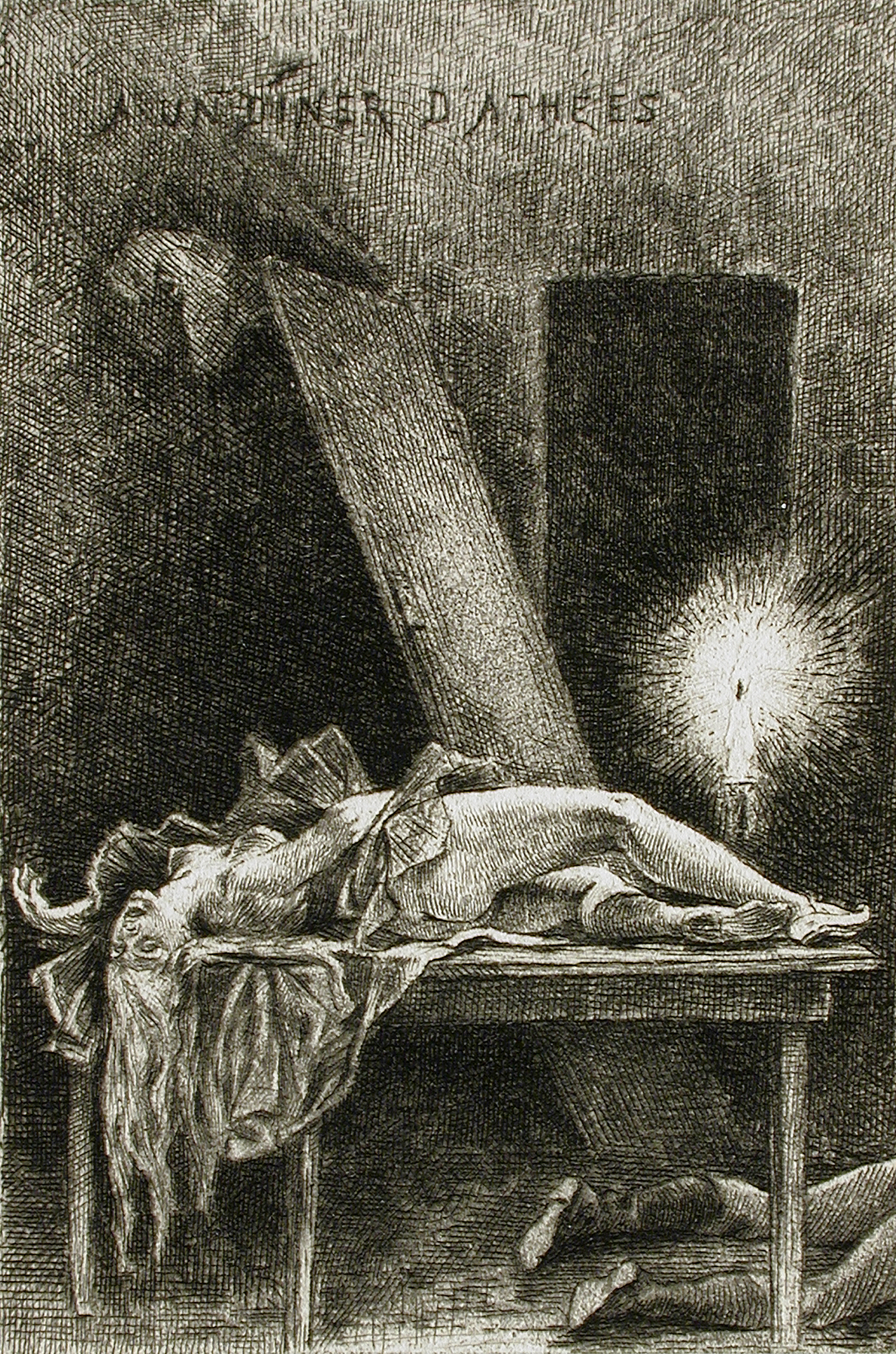
At a Dinner of Atheists, (1882–86) etching (12.38 x 8.73 cm) Los Angeles County Museum of Art

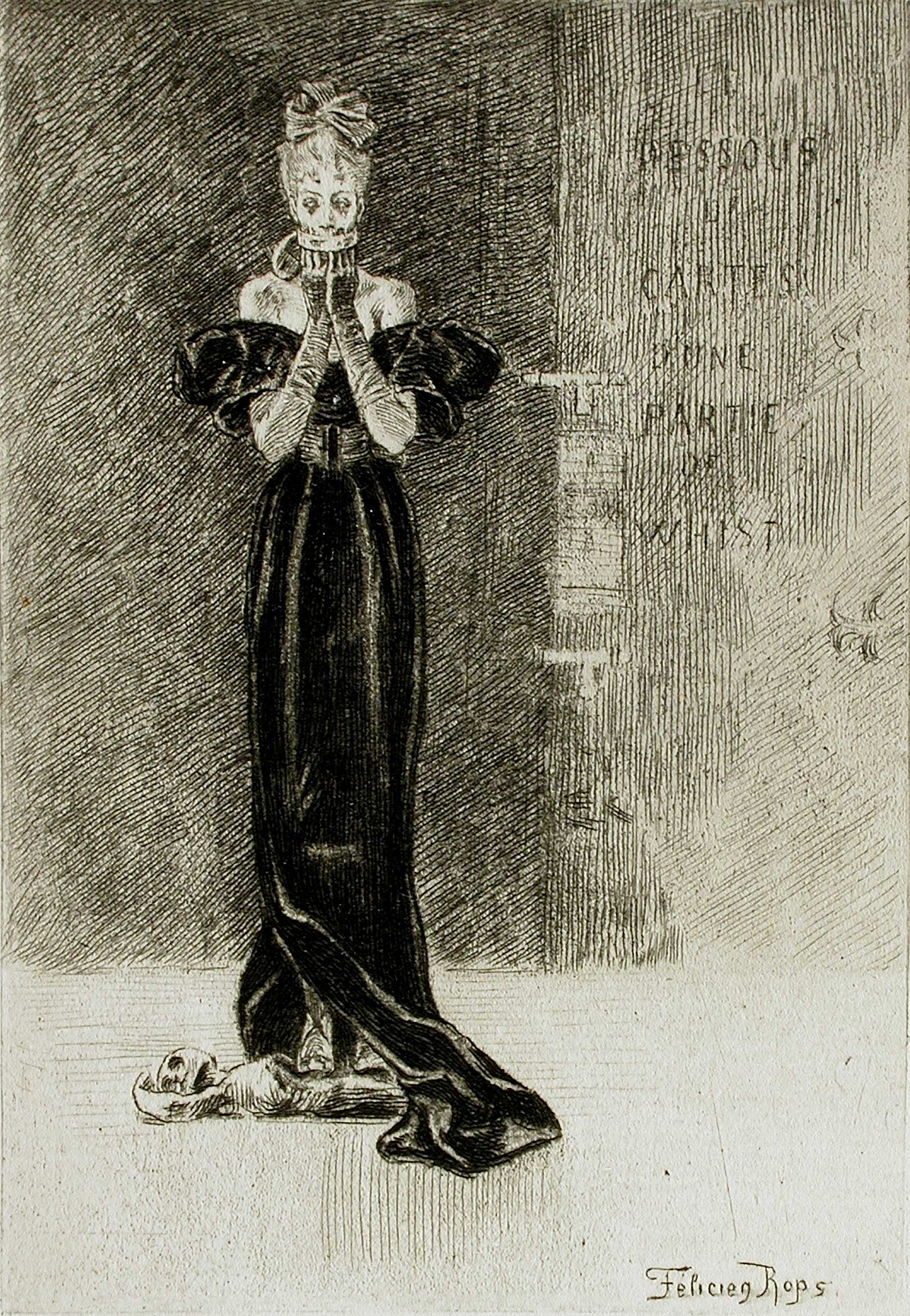
Beneath the Cards in a Game of Whist (ca. 1882–1886) etching (12.38 x 9.05 cm) Los Angeles County Museum of Art

=== Cartoons and caricatures ===
Félicien Rops was a pioneer and considered by many as the starting point for Belgian Comics. He was the first Belgian cartoonist to produce text comics, a comic strip based on a recurring character, satirical, and erotic comics. Rops began publishing comics in student magazines including Le Crocodile and Le Diable au Salon while still in school in the 1850s. He sometimes published using pseudonyms, including Spor, Risette, Graffin, Cham-Loth, and Croque-tout. With friends he co-founded a weekly artistic and literary satirical review The Uylenspiegel in 1856, which he contributed to regularly until its demise 1862. Examples of the early use of text comics and reoccurring characters include Les époux Van-Blague, the comedic experiences of a couple published in Le Crocodile (e.g. issue #40, 20 November 1853) and a series of thematically unified, but otherwise unrelated humorous episodes at the Antwerp Zoo Promenade au Jardin Zoologique. One cartoon in particular, 'La Médaille de Waterloo' (1858), depicting a decrepit, peg legged likeness of Napoléon Bonaparte on a medal, guarded by his devotee's from a hoard of skeletons rising from the dead, (in criticism of those who held Napoléon in honor with seemingly no regard for the havoc and loss of life that he had brought to Europe) caused an outrage in France and Belgium. However, ultimately this only served to further Rops notoriety. Rops published significantly fewer comics as his career as an illustrator of books progressed but, he produced occasional comics, caricatures, even advertisements, throughout his life.

==== Gallery V: cartoons and caricatures ====
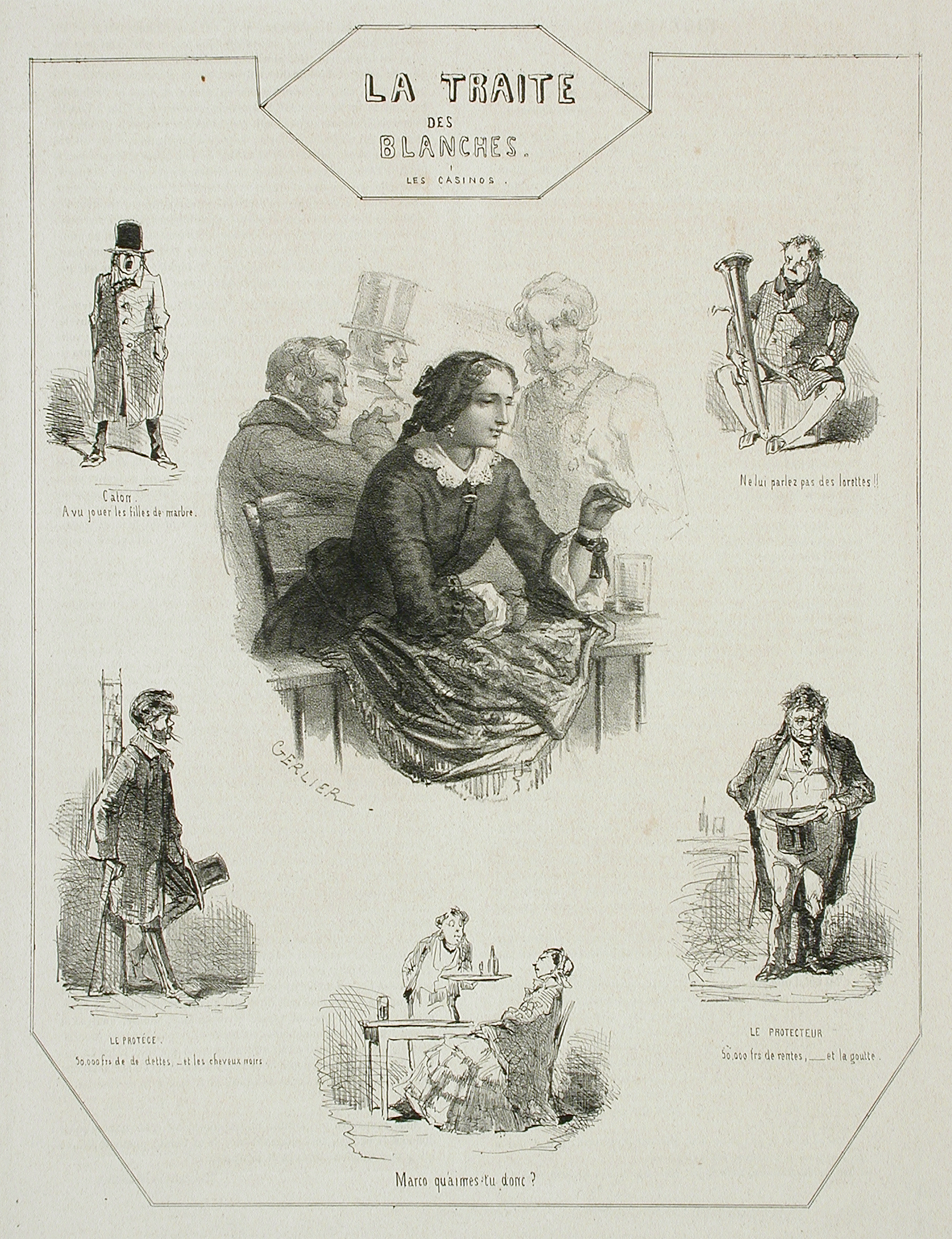
The White Slave: The Casinos (Uylenspiegel, No. 11, 13 Apr. 1856) lithograph (30.16 x 22.7 cm) Los Angeles County Museum of Art

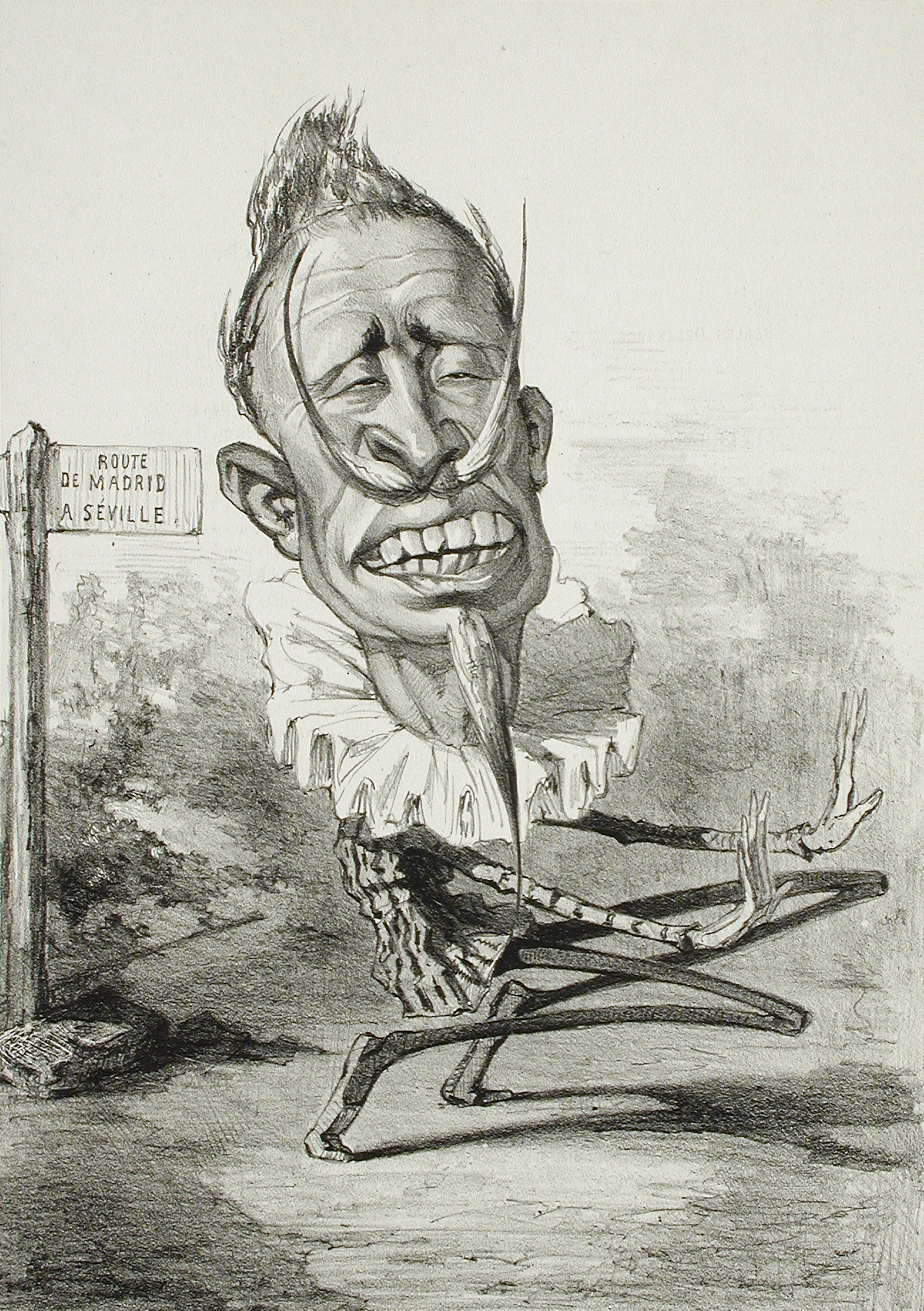
Galerie d'Uylenspiegel, Eduoard (Uylenspiegel, no. 5, 2 March 1856) lithograph (22.54 x 16.03 cm) Los Angeles County Museum of Art

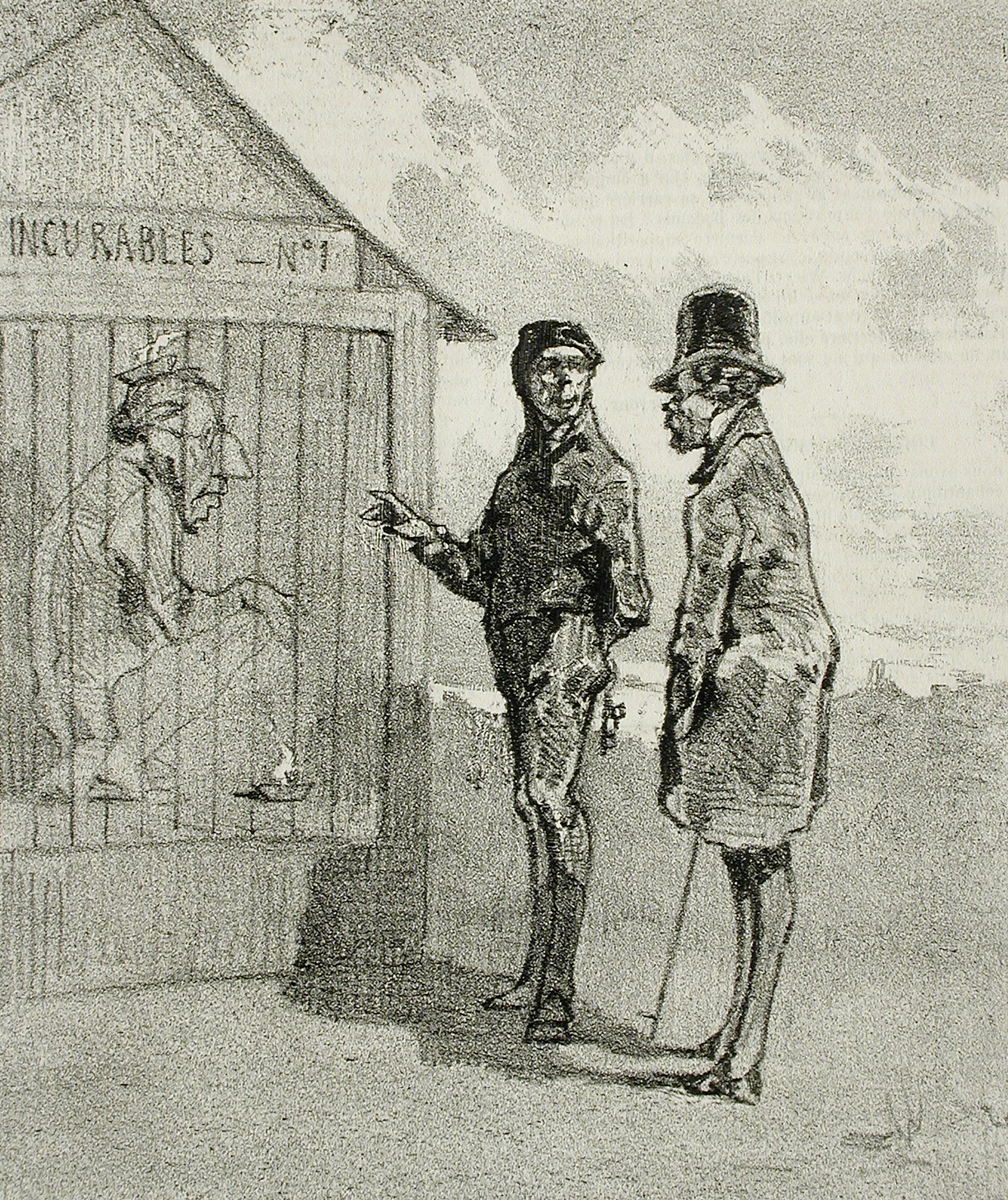
Jardin Zoologique (Uylenspiegel, no. 20, 15 June 1856) lithograph (20.32 x 17.15 cm) Los Angeles County Museum of Art

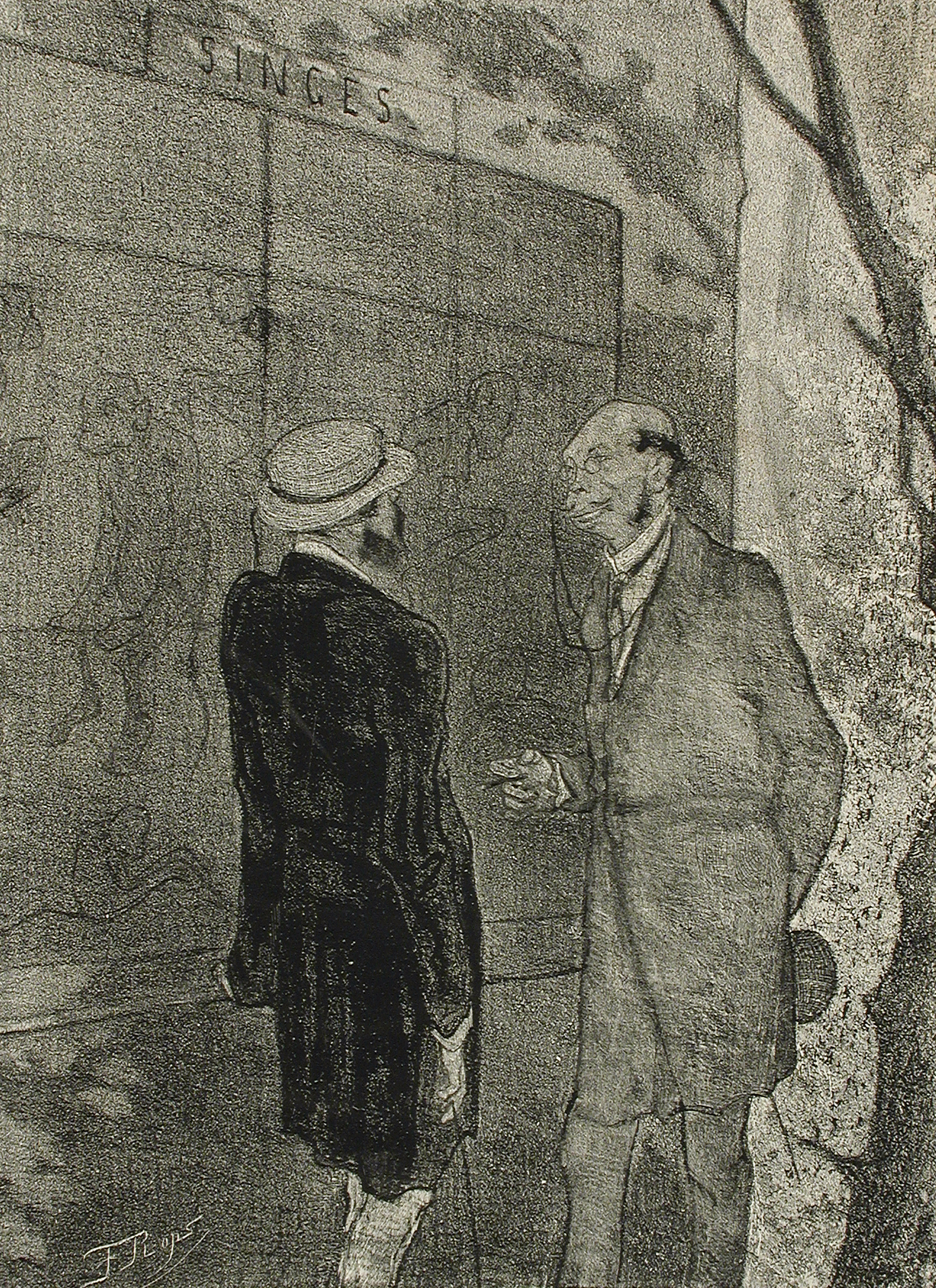
Jardin Zoologique (Uylenspiegel, no. 28, 9 August 1857) lithograph) (28.58 x 20.64 cm) Los Angeles County Museum of Art

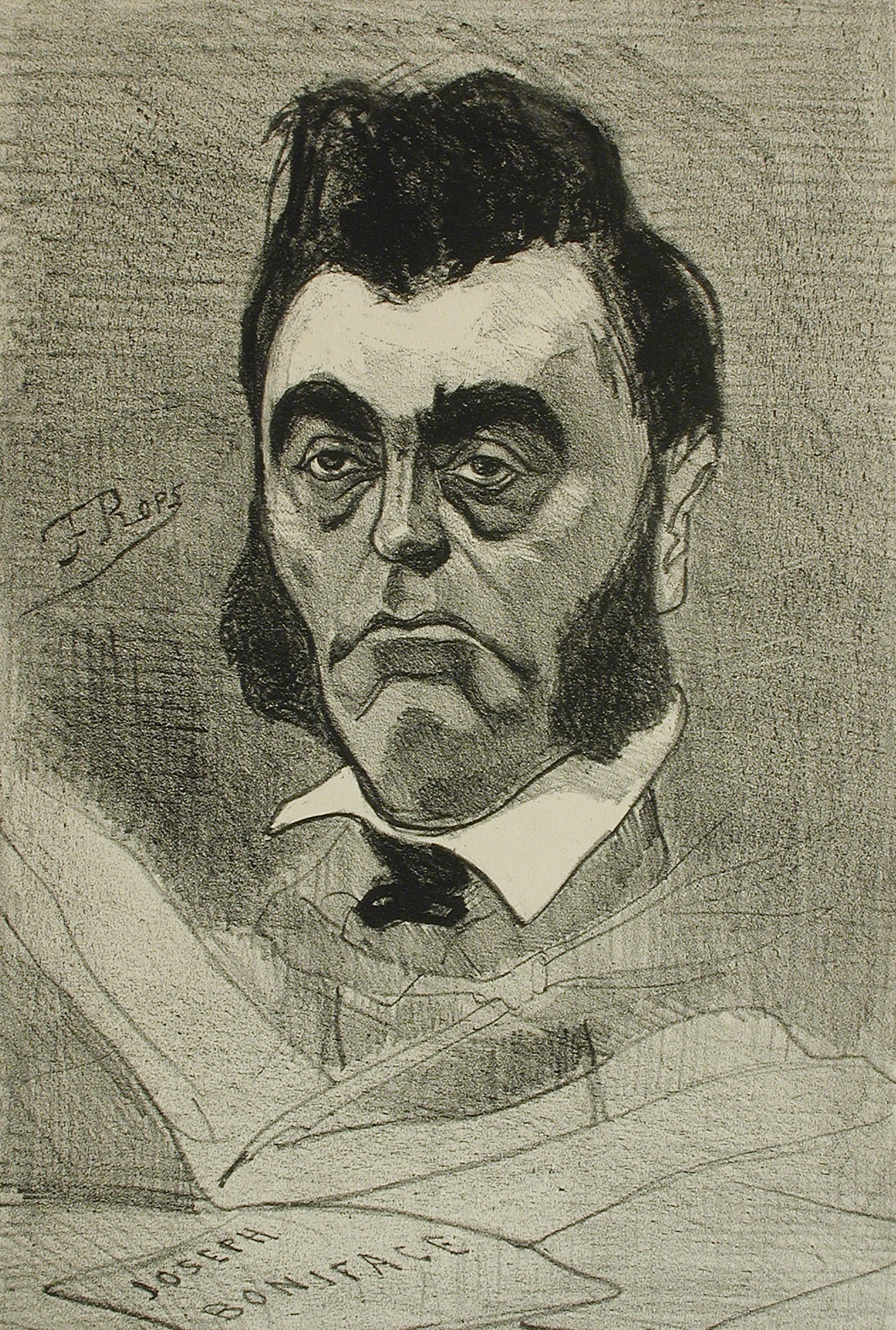
Louis Defré (aka Maurice Voituron & Joseph Boniface), burgomaster of Uccle (1858) lithograph (28.58 x 19.53 cm) L.A. County Museum.

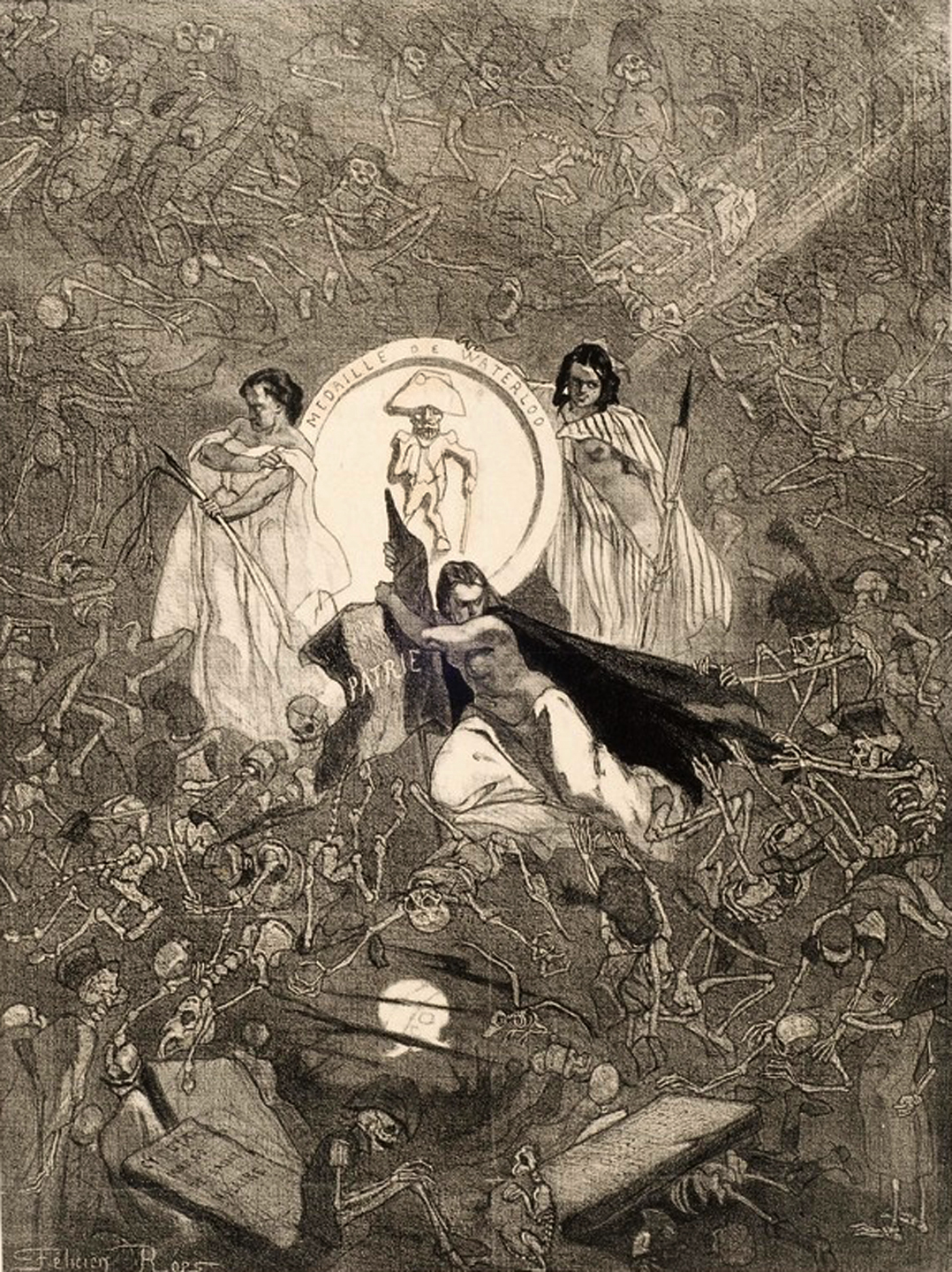
Médaille de Waterloo (1858) lithograph (58.2 x 43.6 cm) Michael C. Carlos Museum, Emory University, Atlanta

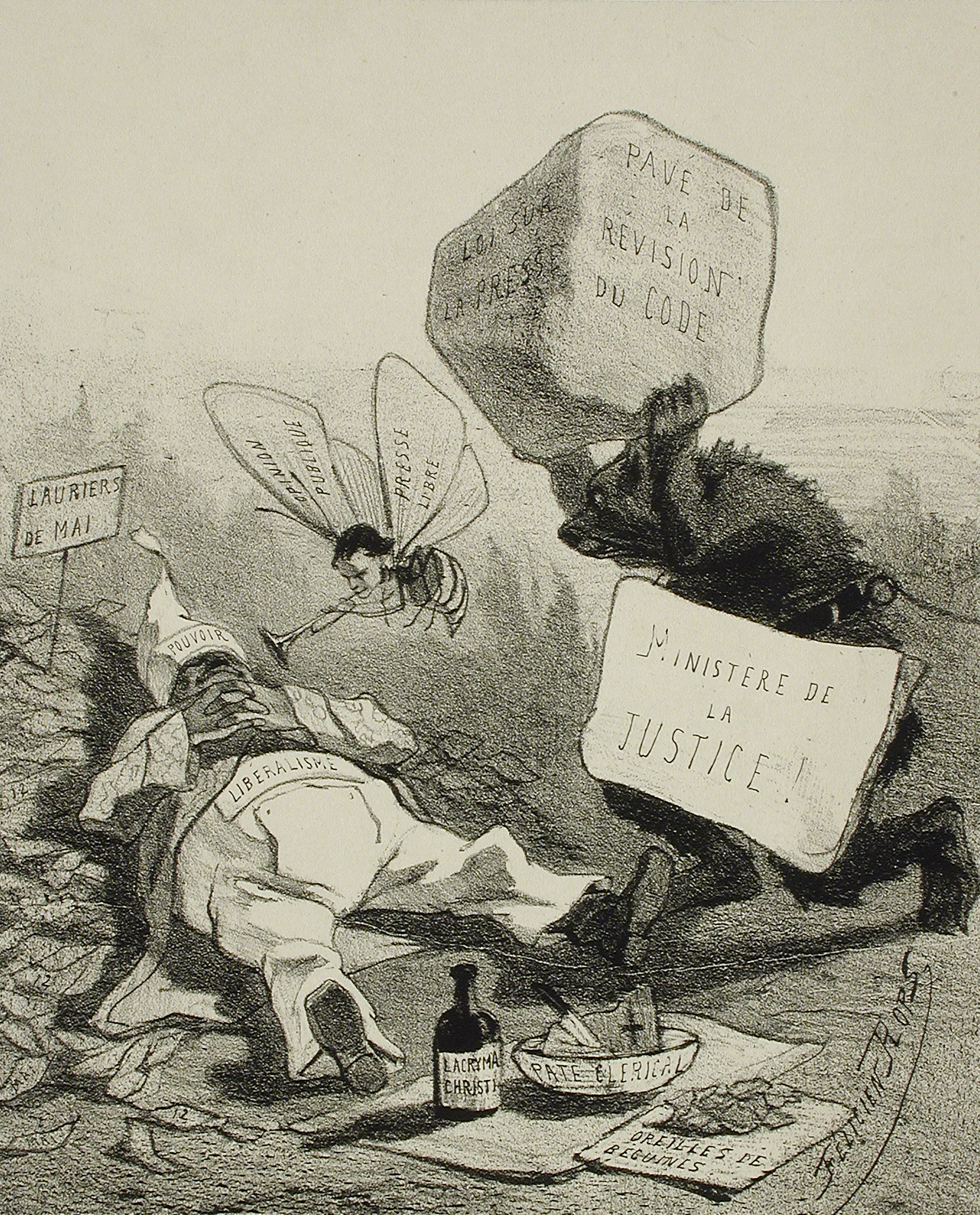
Political Comedy (1859) lithograph (23.65 x 18.89 cm) Los Angeles County Museum of Art of Art

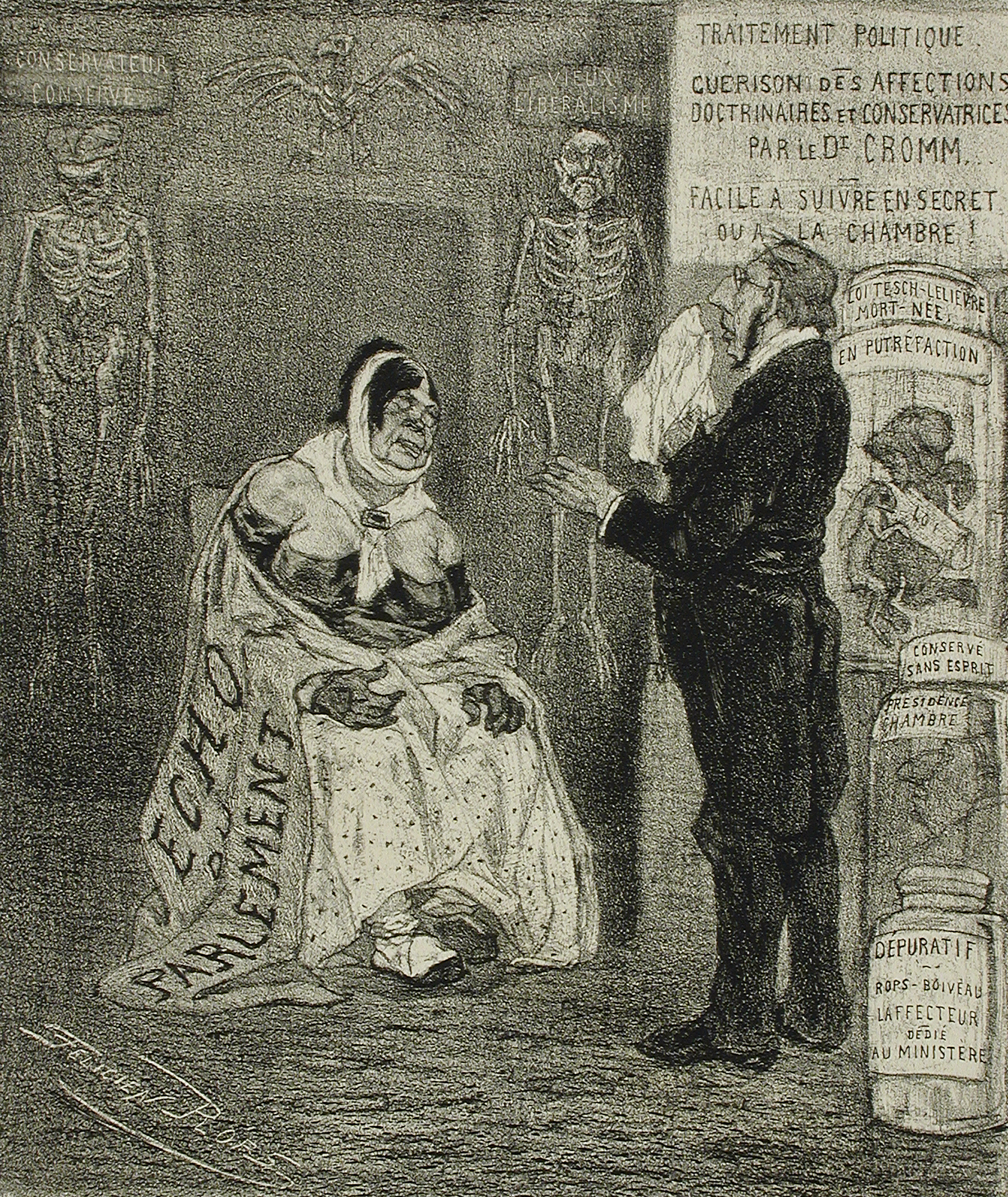
Constitutional Chronicles (no date) lithograph (23.65 x 20 cm) Los Angeles County Museum of Art

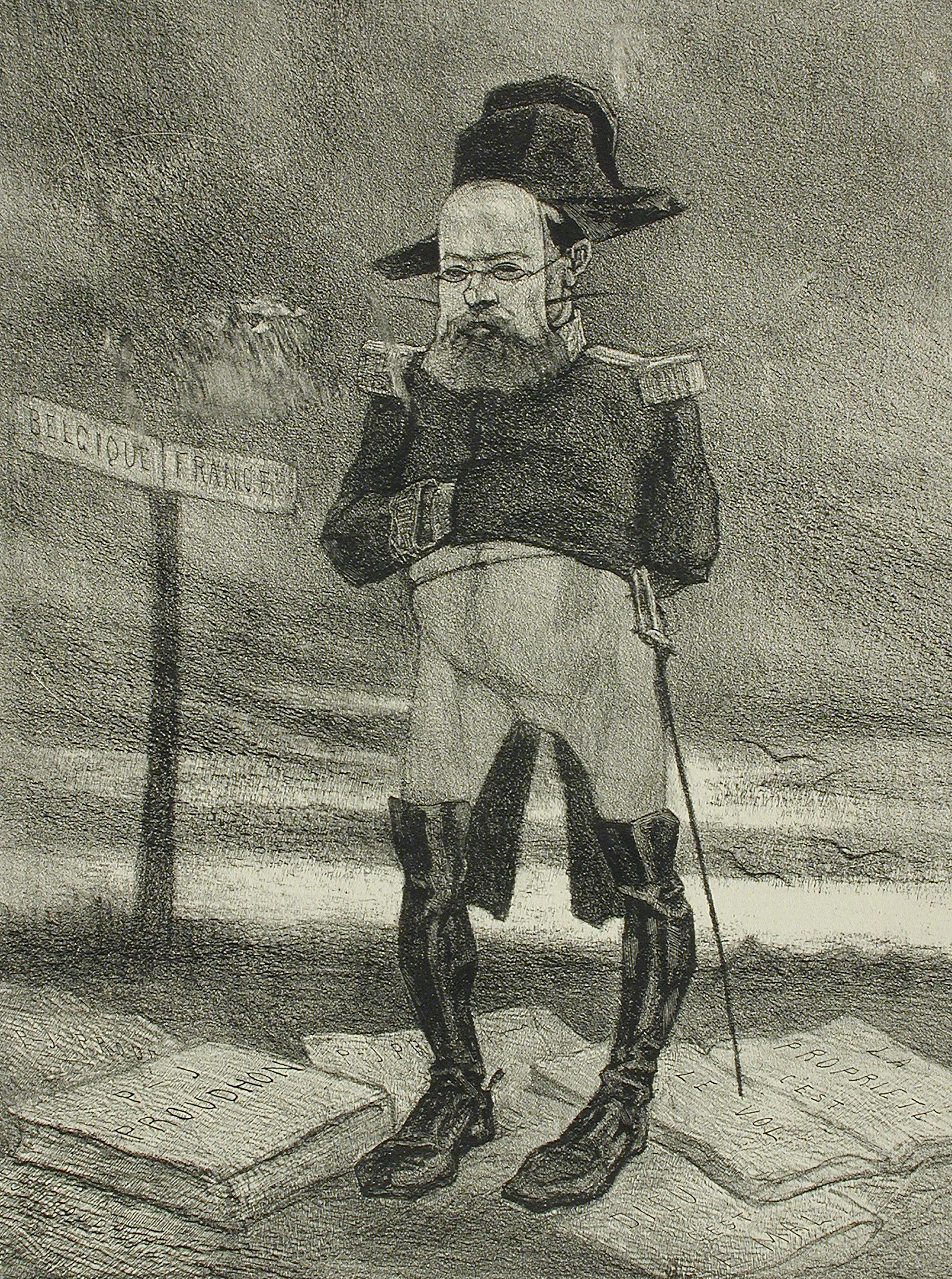
The Last Incarnation of Vautrin (Uylenspiegel, No. 39, 2 Nov. 1862) lithograph (29.53 x 22.07 cm) Los Angeles County Museum of Art

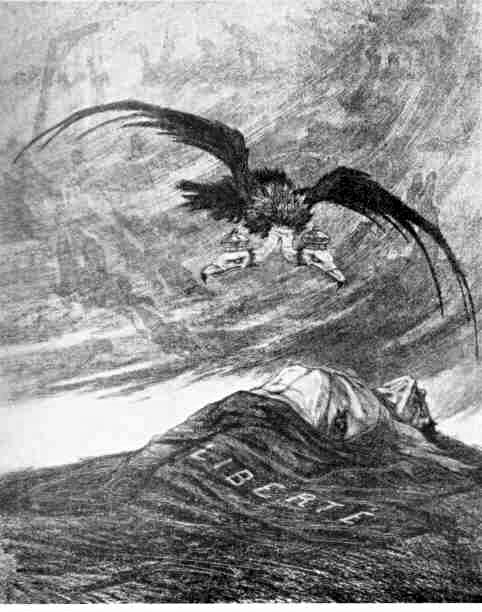
Order Reigns in Warsaw (1863) lithograph (36.4 x 29.7)

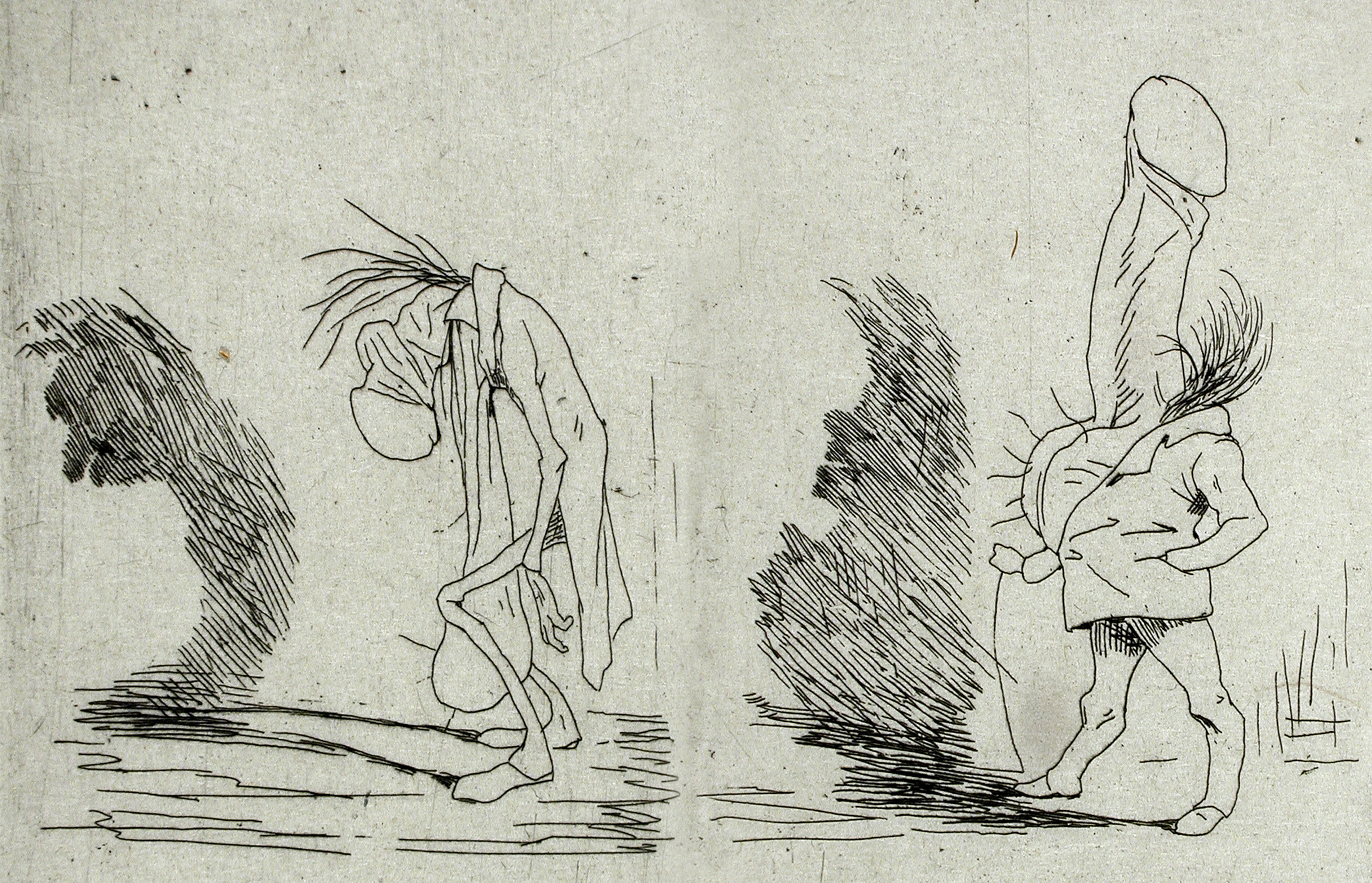
The Right to Rest, The Right to Work (ca. 1868) etching (ca. 7.94 x 10.6 cm) Los Angeles County Museum of Art

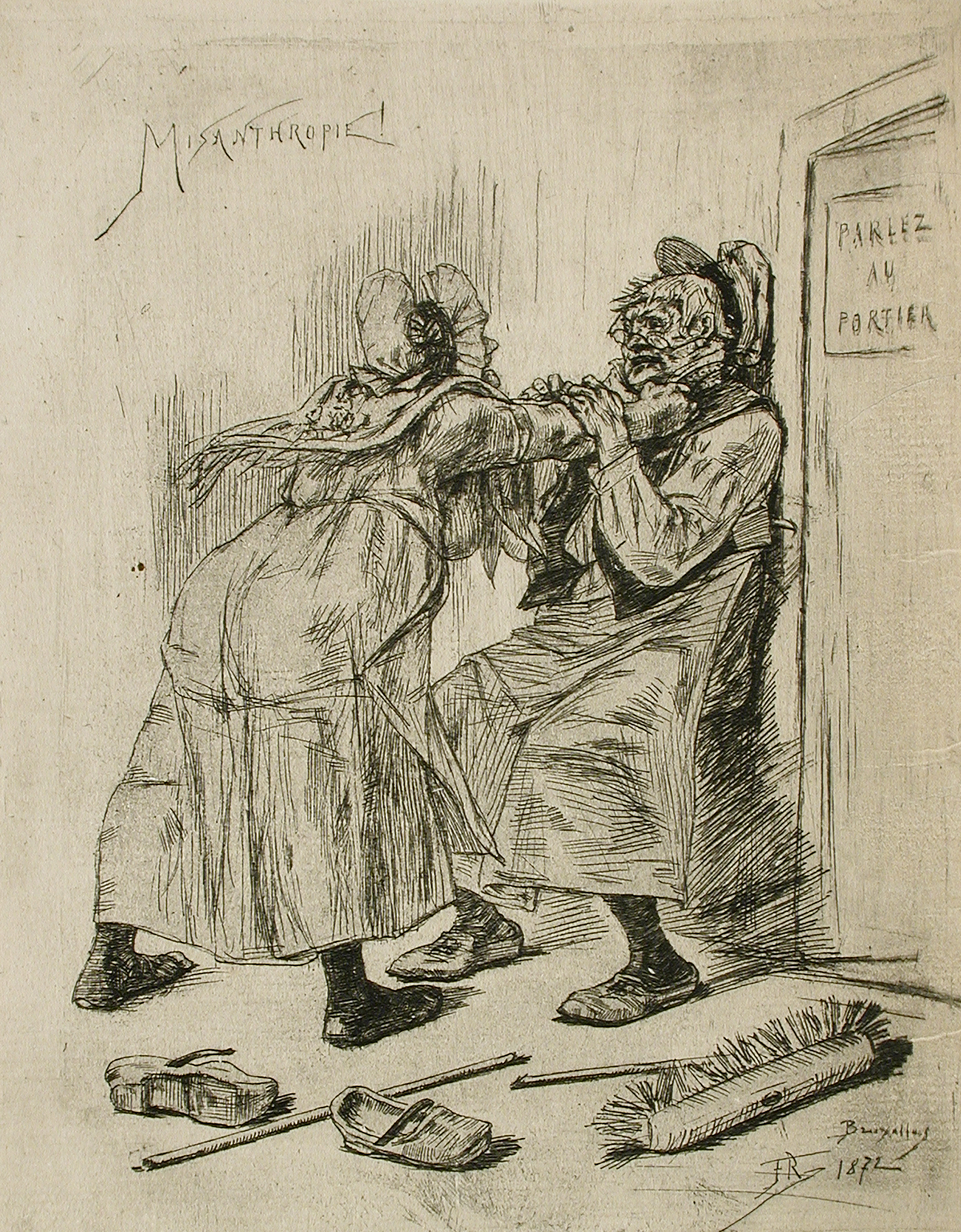
Misanthropie! (1872) etching on Japan paper (19.37 x 15.08 cm) Los Angeles County Museum of Art

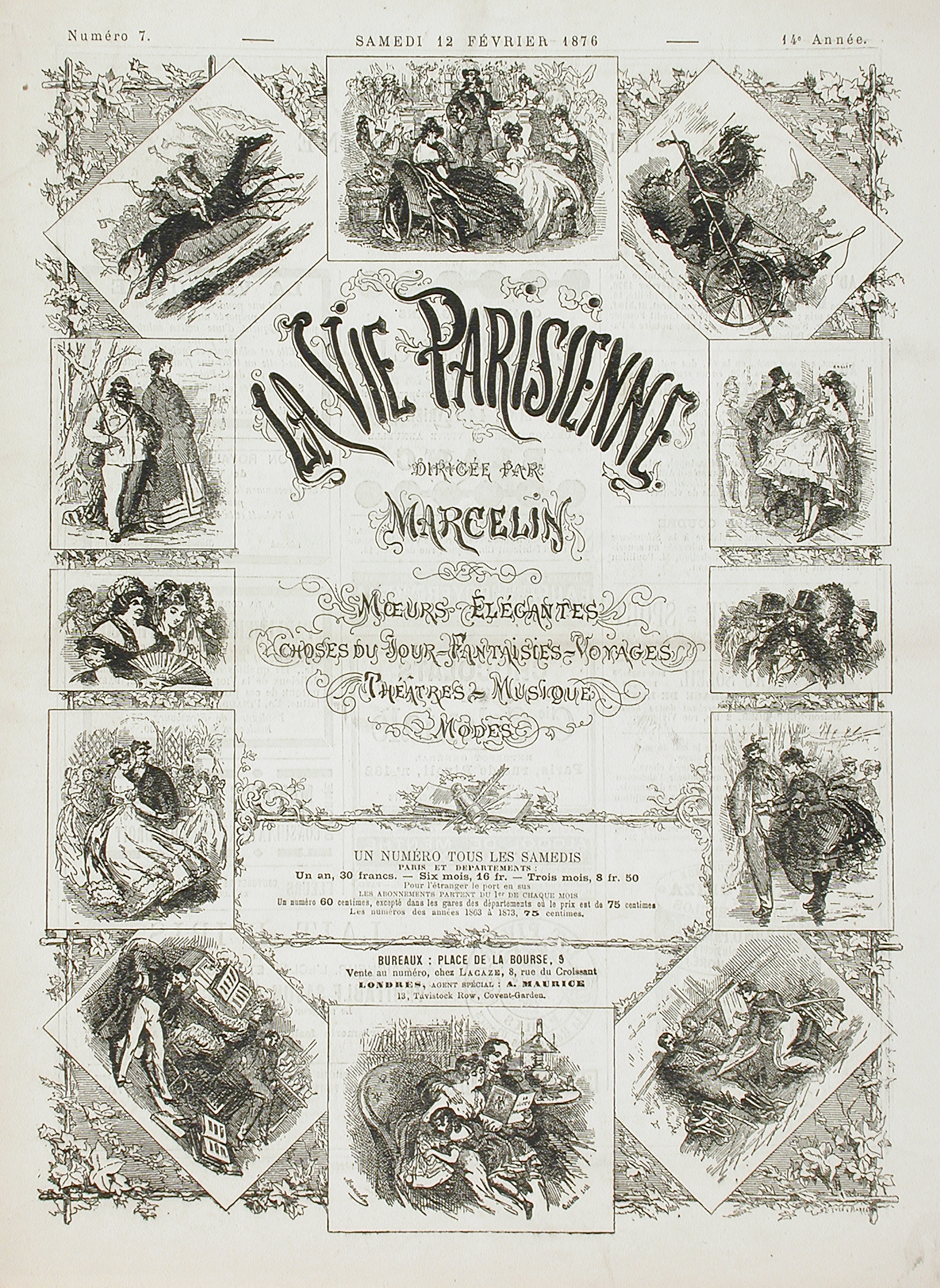
Parisian Life (1876) wood engraving (34.7 x 27.15 cm) Los Angeles County Museum of Art

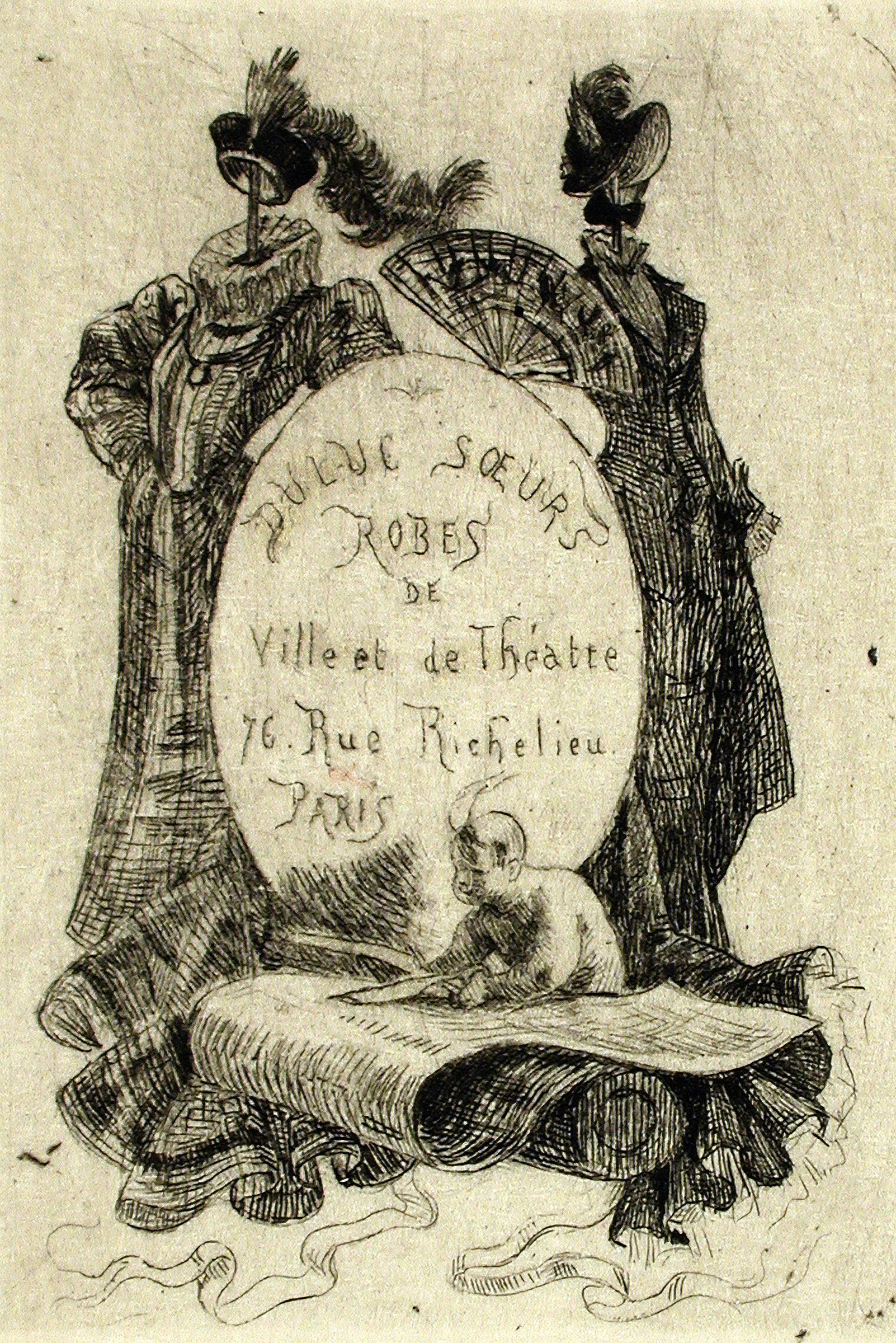
Duluc Sisters, Dresses (no date) etching (7.62 x 5.56 cm) Los Angeles County Museum of Art I

== Bibliography ==
- Dijkstra, Bram (1986), Idols of Perversity: Fantasies of Feminine Evil in Fin-de-Siècle Culture, New York: Oxford University Press, ISBN 0-19-503779-0
- Reed, John R. (1985), Decadent Style, Athens, OH: Ohio University Press, ISBN 0-8214-0793-7
