= 1905 in France =

- Decades: 1880s; 1890s; 1900s; 1910s; 1920s
- See also: History of France; Timeline of French history; List of years in France

Events from the year 1905 in France.

== Incumbents ==
- President: Émile Loubet
- President of the Council of Ministers:
  - until 12 March: Emile Combes
  - 12 March-25 October: Maurice Rouvier
  - starting 25 October: Georges Clemenceau

== Events ==
- 24 January – Maurice Rouvier forms a government as the new Prime Minister of France.
- February – Fierce storm on the Calvados coast.
- 31 March – German emperor William II asserts German equality with France in Morocco, triggering the Tangier or First Moroccan Crisis.
- 13 May – Mata Hari debuts in Paris.
- 14 July – The government of France institutes its first government assistance program for elderly and disabled persons.
- October – The Fauvist artists, notably Henri Matisse, first exhibit, at the Salon d'Automne in Paris.
- 9 December – 1905 French law on the Separation of the Churches and the State is passed, enacting laïcité.
- Louis Delâge produces the first Delage automobile in Levallois-Perret.
- Renault Type AG taxicab begins production at Billancourt and 1,500 are ordered for use in Paris.

== Arts ==
- André Derain - Montagnes à Collioure
- Henri Matisse
  - La Raie verte
  - Landscape at Collioure
  - Fenêtre ouverte, Collioure
  - Les toits de Collioure
  - La femme au chapeau
- Jean Metzinger - Baigneuses: Deux nus dans un paysage exotique
- Pablo Picasso
  - Acrobate et jeune Arlequin
  - Au Lapin Agile
  - Famille d'acrobates avec singe
  - Famille de saltimbanques
  - Garçon à la pipe
  - Jeune femme en chemise
  - Girl on a Ball
  - Les Noces de Pierrette
  - Fillette à la corbeille fleurie
- Robert Antoine Pinchon - Le Pont aux Anglais, soleil couchant
- Henri Rousseau - Le lion ayant faim se jette sur l'antilope
- Paul Signac
  - Le Grand Canal à Venise
  - The Lagoon of Saint Mark, Venice
  - Le Sentier des Douanes

== Film ==
- Alice Guy-Blaché & Victorin-Hippolyte Jasset - Esmeralda
- Georges Méliès
  - Le Diable noir
  - La Chaise à porteurs enchantée
  - Le Dirigeable fantastique ou le Cauchemar d'un inventeur
  - Les Cartes vivantes
  - L'Île de Calypso
  - Le Palais des mille et une nuits

== Literature ==
- Jules Verne
  - L'Invasion de la mer
  - Le Phare du bout du monde

== Music ==
- Claude Debussy
  - Suite bergamasque
  - La mer
- Reynaldo Hahn - Le Bal de Béatrice d'Este
- Maurice Ravel - Sonatine
- Camille Saint-Saëns - Cello Sonata No. 2
- Florent Schmitt - Reflets d'Allemagne

== Sport ==
- 9–30 July – Third Tour de France, won by Louis Trousselier.

== Births ==
=== January to March ===
- 17 January – Louis Armand, engineer (died 1971)
- 21 January – Christian Dior, fashion designer (died 1957)
- 7 February
  - Paul Nizan, philosopher and writer (died 1940)
  - René de Possel, mathematician (died 1974)
- 8 February – Andre Richaume, archetier/bowmaker (died 1966)
- 3 March – Marie Glory, actress (died 2009)
- 14 March – Raymond Aron, philosopher, sociologist and political scientist (died 1983)
- 20 March – Jean Galia (died 1949), boxer and pioneering rugby footballer
- 28 March – René Maheu, professor of philosophy and Director General of UNESCO (died 1975)

=== April to June ===
- 2 April – Edmond Jouhaud, one of four generals who staged the Algiers putsch of 1961 (died 1995)
- 4 April – Eugène Bozza, composer (died 1991)
- 5 April – Waldeck Rochet, politician (died 1983)
- 13 April – Pierre Schneiter, politician (died 1979)
- 14 April – Jean Pierre-Bloch, French Resistance member (died 1999)
- 24 April – Pierre Chevalier, caver and mountaineer (died 2001)
- 6 May – René Dreyfus, motor racing driver (died 1993)
- 14 May – Jean Daniélou, theologian and historian (died 1974)
- 15 May – Albert Dubout, cartoonist, illustrator, painter and sculptor (died 1976)
- 11 June – Paul Wormser, Olympic fencer (died 1944)
- 20 June – Hélène Bouvier, operatic mezzo-soprano (died 1978)
- 21 June
  - Jacques Goddet, sports journalist and Tour de France director (died 2000)
  - Jean-Paul Sartre, philosopher, dramatist, novelist and critic (died 1980)

=== July to September ===
- 25 July – Georges Grignard, motor racing driver (died 1977)
- 29 July – Pierre Braunberger, producer and actor (died 1990)
- 30 July – Jeanne-Marie Darré, pianist (died 1999)
- 8 August – André Jolivet, composer (died 1974)
- 9 August – Pierre Klossowski, writer, translator and artist (died 2001)
- 20 August – André Giriat, rower and Olympic medallist (died 1967)
- 2 September – Marcel Galey, footballer (died 1991)
- 5 September – Maurice Challe, general (died 1979)

=== October to December ===
- 8 October – André Rollet, footballer (died 1985)
- 10 October – Armand Marcelle, rower and Olympic medallist (died 1974)
- 11 October – Jean-Marie Villot, cardinal (died 1979)
- 23 October – Claude de Cambronne, aircraft manufacturer (died 1993)
- 24 October – Pierre Frank, Trotskyist leader (died 1984)
- 18 November – Paul Paillole, soldier (died 1992)
- 29 November – Marcel Lefebvre, Roman Catholic archbishop (died 1991)
- 22 December – Pierre Brasseur, actor (died 1972)
- 25 December – Étienne Mattler, international soccer player (died 1986)
- 31 December – Guy Mollet, politician (died 1975)

=== Full date unknown ===
- Jacques Baron, poet (died 1986).
- Albert-Félix de Lapparent, palaeontologist and Jesuit priest (died 1975)
- René Taupin, translator, critic and academic (died 1981)

== Deaths ==
=== January to June ===
- 4 February – Louis-Ernest Barrias, sculptor (born 1841)
- 5 February – Antoine Alphonse Chassepot, gunsmith and inventor (born 1833)
- 24 March – Jules Verne, author (born 1828)
- 26 May – Alphonse James de Rothschild, banker and philanthropist (born 1827)
- 1 June – Émile Delahaye, automotive pioneer (born 1843)
- 4 June – Edme-Armand-Gaston d'Audiffret-Pasquier, politician (born 1823)

=== July to December ===
- 9 August – Placide Louis Chapelle, Archbishop in Roman Catholic Archdiocese of New Orleans (born 1842)
- 19 August – William-Adolphe Bouguereau, painter (born 1825)
- 13 September – René Goblet, politician, Prime Minister of France (born 1828)
- 14 September – Pierre Savorgnan de Brazza, explorer (born 1852)
- 25 September – Jacques Marie Eugène Godefroy Cavaignac, politician (born 1853)
- 12 December – François Paul Meurice, dramatist (born 1818)

== See also ==
- List of French films before 1910
