= Entrance to the Grand Canal, Venice =

Entrance to the Grand Canal, Venice may refer to:

- The Entrance to the Grand Canal, Venice, c.1730 painting by Canaletto
- Entrance to the Grand Canal, Venice (Signac), 1905 painting by Paul Signac
