= In the Time of Harmony =

1895 painting by Paul Signac

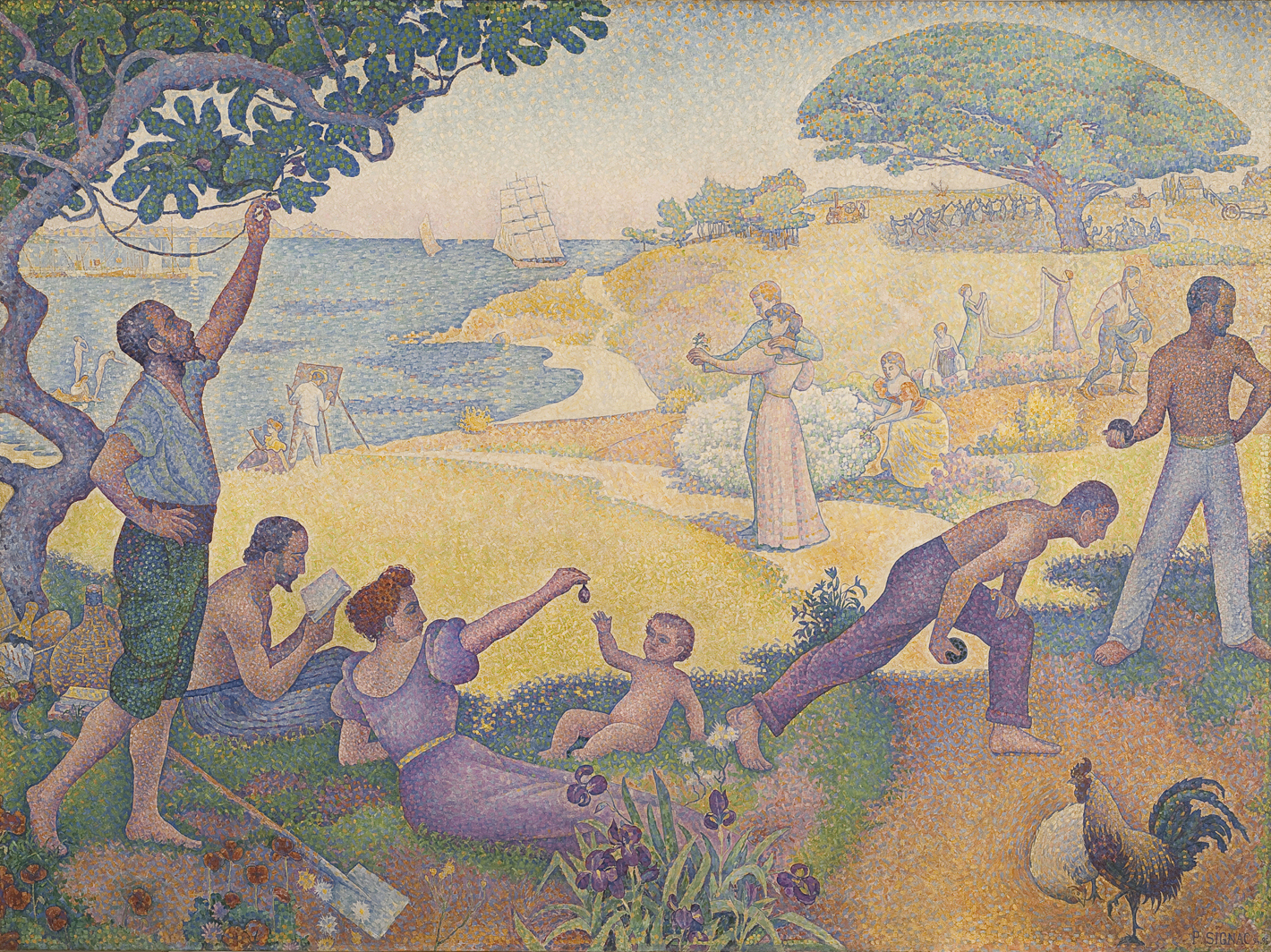
- Year: 1893–95
- Medium: oil on canvas
- Dimensions: 310 cm × 410 cm (120 in × 160 in)
- Location: Hôtel de ville de Montreuil, Seine-Saint-Denis

In the Time of Harmony is a painting by the French post-impressionist artist Paul Signac, completed in 1895 in Saint-Tropez. This pointillist oil painting on canvas represents an idealized society by the seashore where numerous people perform different activities such as foraging, pétanque, reading, dancing, and painting. Shown at the Salon des indépendants in 1895, it has since been in the grand staircase of the Montreuil city hall in Seine-Saint-Denis.

Sketch from 1893

== Political undertones ==
The painting was shaped by Signac's engagement with socialism in the wake of the 1894 assassination of President Sadi Carnot. Many of Signac's close friends and colleagues, including Félix Fénéon and Maximilien Luce, were jailed in Mazas prison and tried as part of the Trial of the Thirty for their anarchist connections but Signac was able to avoid imprisonment in part because of the indirect manner in which he depicted socialist themes in his work. Signac said on the matter, "Justice in sociology, harmony in art: same thing. The anarchistic painter is not the one who produces anarchist pictures, but the one who, without thought of fain, without desire for regard, battles with all official conventions by making a personal contribution."

While he was not one to shy away from a political statement in his work, Signac did so with undertones. For example, when he was creating the composition of the painting, he added in a rooster in the bottom right corner, which could serve equally as a symbol of a new dawn and as a reference to anarchist politics. He wrote in his journal on 7 August 1894: "drew the rooster. Beginning of the trial of the thirty."

The multiple titles of the piece also played a role in its ambiguous meaning, variously presenting the work as a scene of outdoor "harmony" or as an expression of protest and political resistance. The title of the work was originally In the Time of Anarchy. It was changed by self-censorship to In the Time of Harmony. But the painting maintains a utopian subtitle without being overtly anarchist: "The golden age is not in the past; it is in the future." The piece was originally meant to be the final piece of a larger series with other panels representing boat haulers, wreckers, and builders showing that France was far from a time of harmony but it was achievable if the country put in the work and made a change. This utopia would include all of the elements in the painting, creating a world where family, work, and play existed harmoniously.

== Inspiration ==
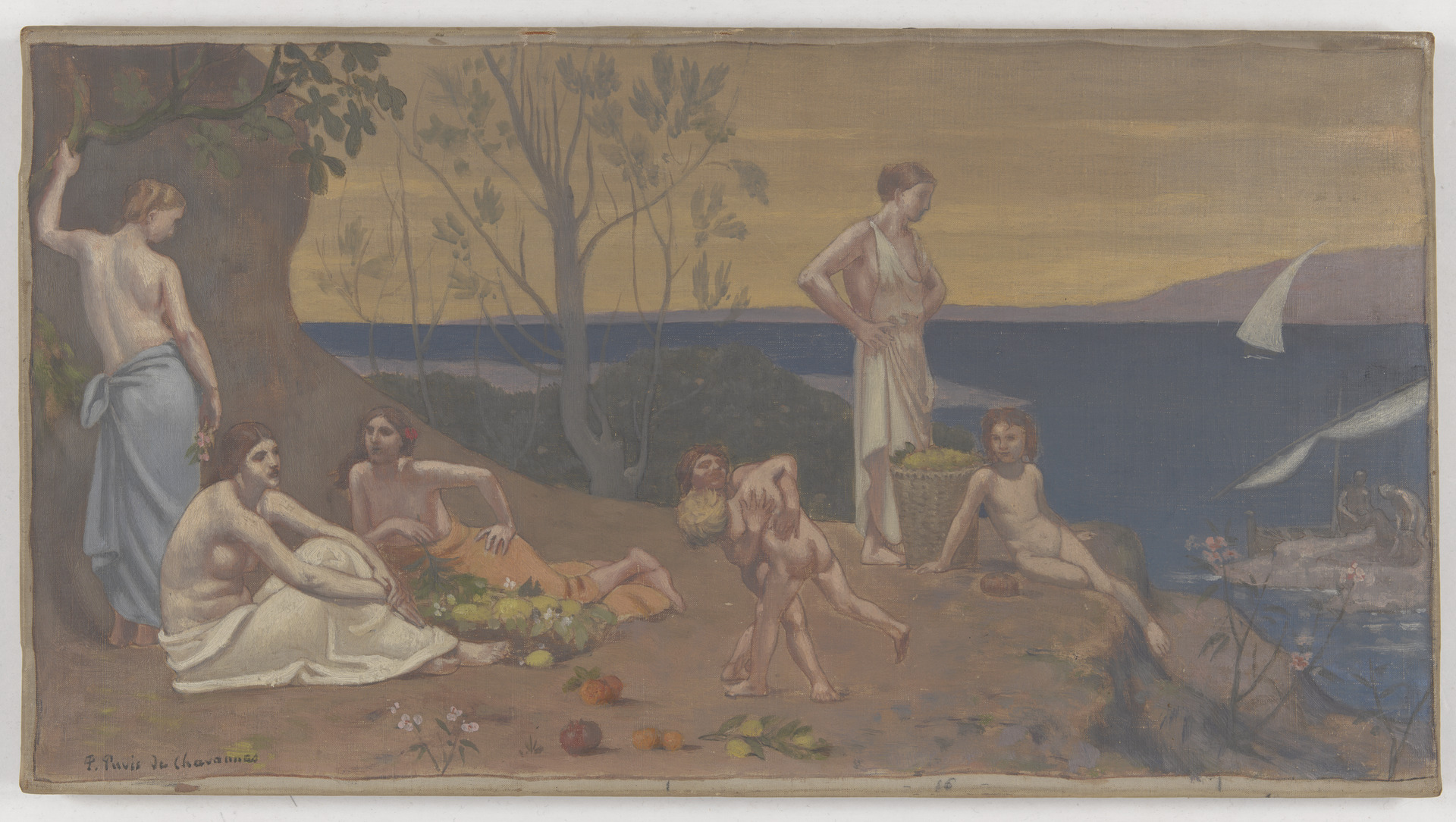
Pierre Puvis de Chavannes, Pleasant Land, 1882, oil on canvas

In a thank you note to Jean Grave for sending his book La Société mourante et l'anarchie, Signac wrote, "the hope of that near future in which at last, for the first time, every individuality will be free... what practical and habitable monuments you are erecting! How freely one can breathe in them". From this vision of a freer society, Signac began to create In the Time of Harmony with Saint Tropez as his backdrop. Signac was inspired by his modern surroundings which can be seen with the elements specific to Saint Tropez, including the pine grove with berthoud pine, the local jetty and beach, and the local petanque players. He was also inspired by the work of other artists, including Pierre Puvis de Chavannes' painting Pleasant Land.

== Studies and process ==
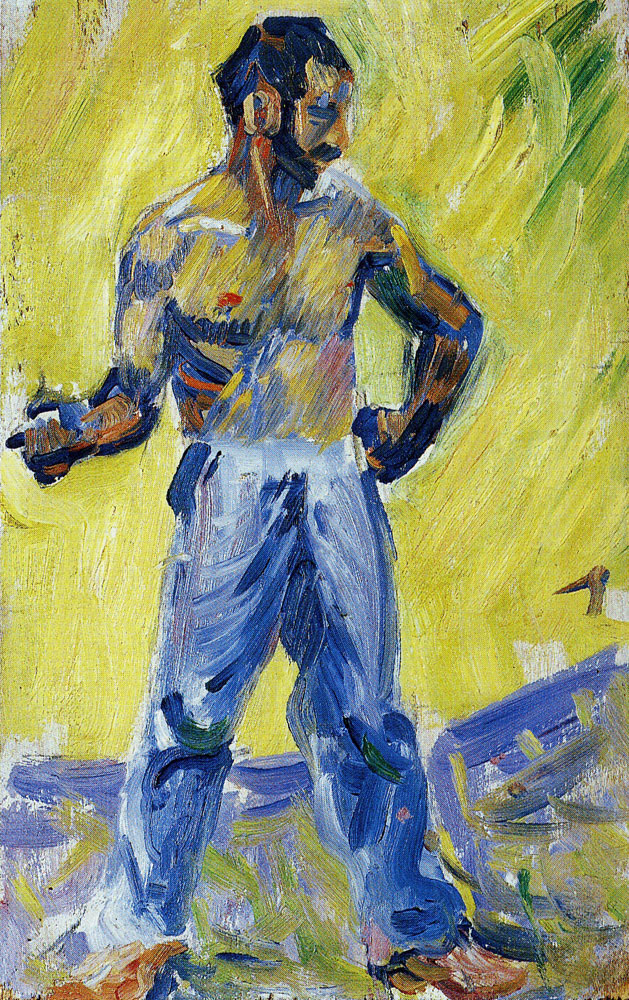
Study for In the Time of Harmony Boules Player, 1894 Study for In the Time of Harmony Man Reading, 1894 Study for In the Time of Harmony Woman, 1894 Study for In the Time of Harmony Oleanders, 1894 Study for In the Time of Harmony Poppies, 1894 Study for In the Time of Harmony Plage des Graniers, Saint-Tropez, 1894 In the Time of Harmony color lithograph study, 1895-86

Signac, as a post-impressionist, shunned the Impressionist en plein air style. He instead produced intricate studies and took years to create this painting. The first study was a loose sketch made with blue and black ink wash over graphite in 1893. He annotated this study writing "pine groves, round, machines, women hanging out washing, sower, lovers, iris, mimosa, women picking flowers, flowers". Then Signac painted an oil-on-canvas study in color in 1893. After completing these two sketches, he made studies of individual elements and figures, including:

- standing man, 1894
- man reading, 1894
- woman, 1894
- boules player, 1894
- oleanders, 1894
- irises, 1894
- poppies, 1894
- plage des graniers (1), saint-tropez, 1894
- plage des graniers (2), saint-tropez, 1894

Finally, Signac completed two full studies before making his final painting: one in black ink and graphite and the other in color lithograph both from 1895-96.
