= Port of Marseille =

Port of Marseille may refer to:

- Marseille-Fos Port
- Old Port of Marseille
- The Port of Marseille, a painting by Paul Signac
