= Cassis, Cap Lombard, Opus 196 =

Painting by Paul Signac

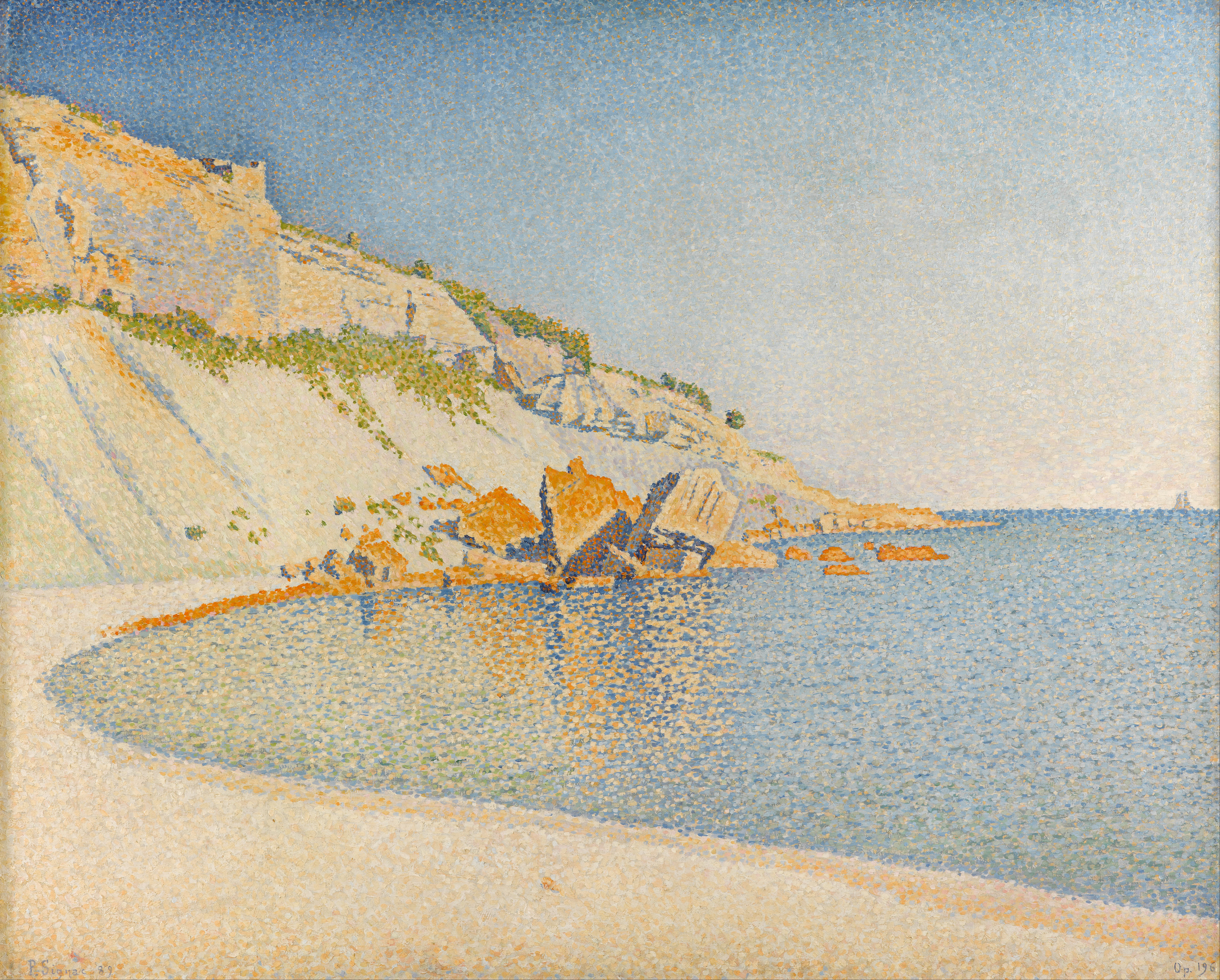
- Artist: Paul Signac
- Year: 1889
- Medium: Oil on canvas
- Dimensions: 83.5 cm × 99.8 cm (32.9 in × 39.3 in)
- Location: Kunstmuseum Den Haag; Den Haag

Cassis, Cap Lombard, Opus 196 is an oil on canvas painting of 1889 by the French artist Paul Signac. It depicts the village of Cassis. He was very enthused with the landscape; he made five paintings in Cassis. Signac described this painting in a letter to Vincent van Gogh: "White, blue, orange, harmonically dispersed in pretty undulations. All around mountains with rhythmic curves."

The painting hangs in the Kunstmuseum, in The Hague, Netherlands.

== See also ==
- List of paintings by Paul Signac
