= Capo di Noli =

Painting by Paul Signac

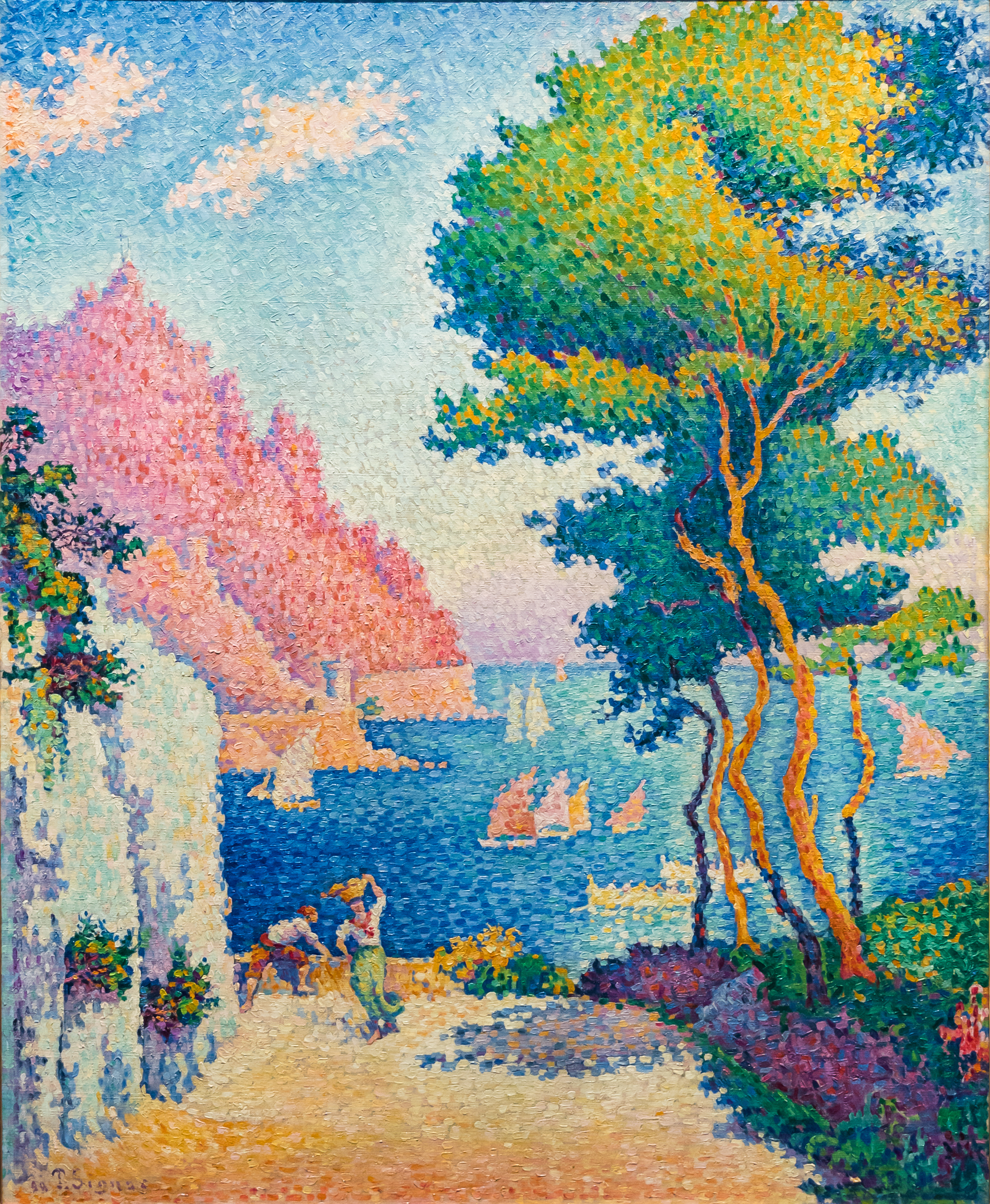
- Artist: Paul Signac
- Year: 1898
- Medium: Oil on canvas
- Dimensions: 93.5 cm × 75 cm (36.8 in × 30 in)
- Location: Wallraf–Richartz Museum; Cologne

Capo di Noli is an oil on canvas painting of 1898 by the French artist Paul Signac. It depicts a cape on the Italian Riviera, close to Genoa. Signac hiked there from Saint-Tropez two years before the painting was completed, and of his intentions he wrote he "wanted to take every corner of the canvas to the absolute extreme in terms of colour."

== See also ==
- List of paintings by Paul Signac
