= Richard Otto Gläsel =

German bowmaker

- Born: 24 October 1885; Markneukirchen, Germany
- Died: 29 January 1931 (aged 45); Markneukirchen, Germany
- Citizenship: Germany
- Occupations: Bowmaker, Violin maker
- Known for: Manufacturing violin bows, often branded with French makers' names
- Parents: Heinrich Wilhelm Louis Gläsel (father); Friedericke Emma Schneider (mother)

Richard Otto Gläsel (1885–1931) was a German bowmaker or bogenmacher.

== Biography ==
Gläsel, Richard ‘Otto’, was born in Markneukirchen October 24 1885. His father Heinrich Wilhelm Louis Gläsel (d.14 April 1922) was a maker of brass instruments, as well as a ‘factory worker’. On 17 May 1877 Heinrich Wilhelm Louis Gläsel married Friedericke Emma Schneider (d.18 October 1932) and the couple had seven children: Heinrich Max, Emil Paul, Richard Otto, Theodor Walter (b.3 March 1889) and three others. Heinrich’s family was not related to the famous Gläsel dynasty of Markneukirchen instrument makers. Only two of Heinrich’s four surviving children followed their father into instrument making, Theodor Walter, became a violin maker and Richard Otto, learned bow making with Ernst Robert Knorr Sr., a Markneukirchen maker for whom he worked after his training.

In 1911 the 25-year-old Gläsel traveled to Paris, where he was appointed as an assistant to Claude Thomassin at 37 Rue de Paradis, whose influence is apparent in many details of Gläsel’s work. At the onset of WWI (in 1914), Gläsel came back to Markneukirchen where he set up shop in the family home at Lindleinstrasse 603. Richard Otto’s two elder brothers were mobilized to the front lines. Heinrich Max was killed, and Emil Paul was reported missing in action. (Richard) Otto, (Theodor) Walter Gläsel (his younger brother) and their widowed mother Emma Gläsel all resided at the same address. Otto was listed as a bow maker and Walter as a violin maker.

Gläsel was also a violin maker, whose customers included the Hamburg maker Georg Winterling (1859–1929). He produced bows for Claude Thomassin, Johann Karl Padewet and Georg Winterling. During the Hyperinflation period in Germany, made many copies of great 19th century bowmakers/archetiers.

“At the onset of the Great Depression in Germany, the 45-year-old Richard Otto Gläsel committed suicide on 29 January 1931. His mother Emma Gläsel died the following year on 18 October 1932. After her death, Walter sold the Gläsel house and moved to Wernitzgrüner Strasse 34 in Markneukirchen. Richard Otto Gläsel’s short-lived working career shows an interesting evolution in style, as he has left a considerable number of high-quality instruments and bows, some of which make us wonder if ‘they could be French’.” –

Many of his bows are branded ‘O. GLÈSEL’, ‘O. GLÈSEL A PARIS’ (French version of his spelling). Bows made before 1920's are branded ‘OTTO GLÈSEL’, ‘TUBBS’.

== Quotes ==
“his business cards read Ex ouvrier de C. Thomassin à Paris (‘Former employee of C. Thomassin in Paris’). He also branded his bows ‘O. GLÈSEL A PARIS’, implying that his work was more French than German.” –

"The majority of Gläsel’s work was stamped with various brands of famous French bow makers, such as ‘VUILLAUME À PARIS’, ‘F.N. VOIRIN A PARIS’, ‘A. LAMY A PARIS’, ‘A. VIGNERON A PARIS’ and, ‘C. THOMASSIN À PARIS’."

== Sources ==
- Parisian Splendour by Gennady Filimonov The Strad magazine April 2024 PARISIAN SPLENDOUR | The Strad April 2024 p.36-p.41
- Die Geigen und Lautenmacher – by Lutgendorff, Frankfurt 1922
- Encyclopedia of the Violin – Alberto Bachmann
- Roda, Joseph (1959). Bows for Musical Instruments. Chicago: W. Lewis. OCLC 906667.
- Vannes, Rene (1985) [1951]. Dictionnaire Universel del Luthiers (vol.3). Bruxelles: Les Amis de la musique. OCLC 53749830.
- William, Henley (1969). Universal Dictionary of Violin & Bow Makers. Brighton; England: Amati. ISBN 0-901424-00-5.
- Deutsche Bogenmacher-German Bow Makers Klaus Grunke, Hans Karl Schmidt, Wolfgang Zunterer 2000 ISBN 978-3-00-005839-4
