= List of paintings by Paul Signac =

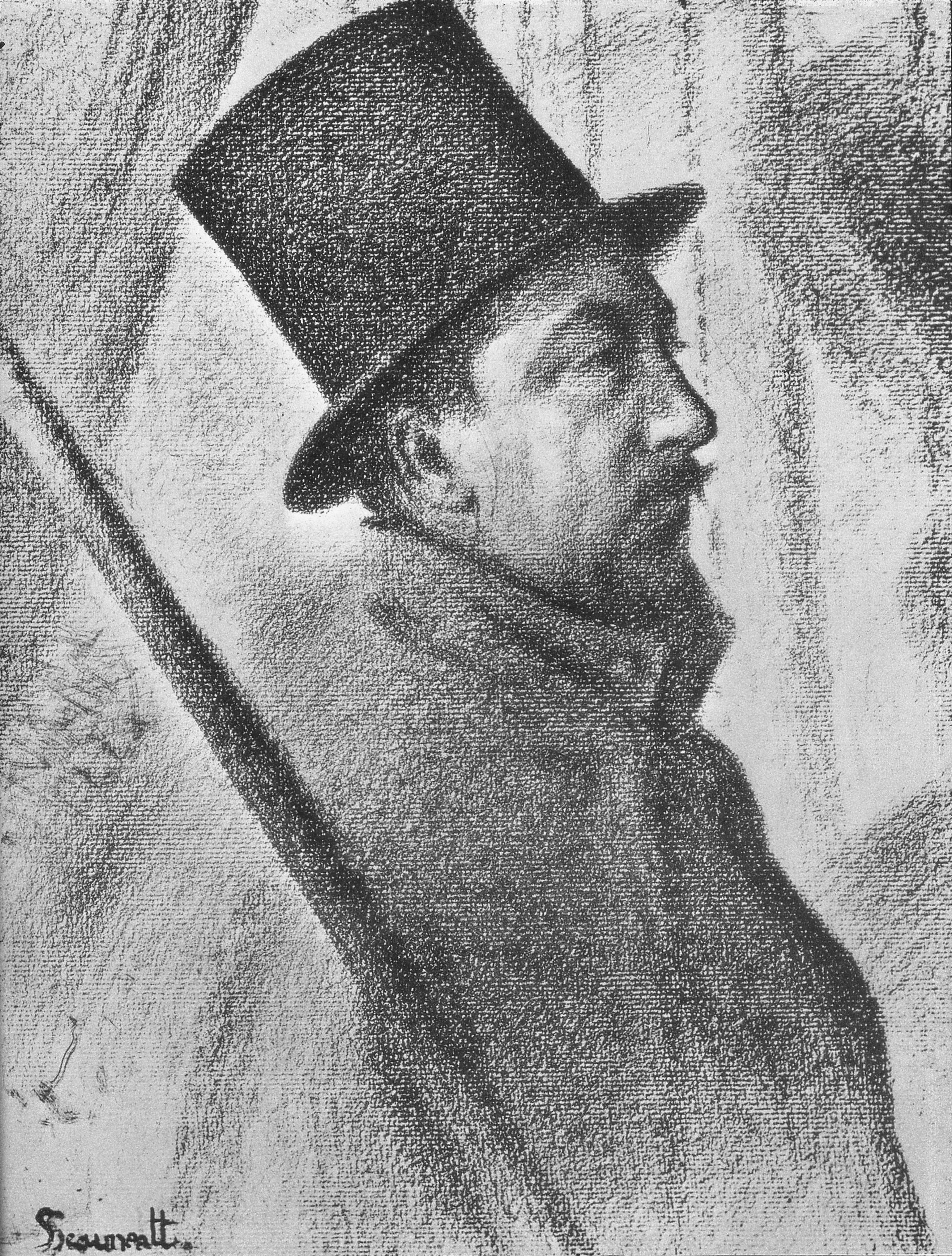
Seurat: Portrait of Signac

This article lists a selection of notable works created by Paul Signac. The listing follows the 2001 book Signac 1863-1935: Master Neo-Impressionist. The collection of paintings by Paul Signac on the French website vasari.fr with its assigned titles, years and catalogue numbers from the catalogue raisonée by Francoise Cachin is used in addition.

== Paintings ==
Image Title in French	Year Title in English	Museums	Catalogue Number Wikimedia
	1863; Paris; Birth		
Les meules. Guise	1882; Guise; The millstones		003; More images
Etude Asnières (bateau-lavoir)	1882; Asniêres; Study	Suzuki Fine Art Corporation, London	005; More images
Etude Asnieres (la barque au passeur)	1882; Asniêres; The Boat to the Ferryman		006; More images
Etude Asnieres (n°5, les égouts)	1882; Asniêres; The Sewers		009; More images
Etude Port-en-Bessin	1882; Port-en-Bessin; Study		010; More images
Etude Port-en-Bessin (n°5, l'avant-port)	1882; Port-en-Bessin; The Outer Harbour	Musée des Impressionnismes Giverny	014; More images
Etude Port-en-Bessin (n°11, bateaux à l'épi)	1882; Port-en-Bessin; Boats at the Cob		020; More images
Etude Montmartre (atelier)	1883; Montmartre; Workshop		023; More images
Port-en-Bessin. La plage	1883; Port-en-Bessin; The Beach	Museum Barberini, Potsdam	025; More images
L'échafaudage du Sacré-Cœur	1883; Paris; The Scaffolding of the Sacre-Coeur	Private collection	027; More images
Etude Asnieres (Charles Torquet vu de dos)	1883; Asnieres; Charles Torquet seen from behind	Private collection	031; More images
Etude Asnieres (jardin de banlieue)	1883; Asnieres; Suburban Garden		032; More images
Le bas rouge	1883; The Red Stocking	Private collection	033; More images
Etude Port-en-Bessin (étude n°1)	1883; Port-en-Bessin; Study No.1		036; More images
Etude Port-en-Bessin (n°8, la falaise)	1883; Port-en-Bessin; The cliff		042; More images
Route de Gennevilliers	1883; Paris; The Road to Gennevilliers	Musée d'Orsay, Paris	048; More images
Péniches. Asnières	1883; Asnières; Barge		052; More images
Rue Caulaincourt : moulins à Montmartre	1884; Montmartre; Rue Caulaincourt	Musée Carnavalet, Paris	058; More images
Square Saint-Pierre (construction du Sacré-Cœur)	1884; Paris; Square Saint-Pierre, (construction of Sacré-Cœur)	Kunstmuseum Basel	059; More images
La Seine au jardin des plantes (au quai Saint-Bernard)	1884; Paris; The Seine at Quay St. Bernard		060; More images
La Seine. Quai d'Austerlitz (La Seine au pont d'Austerlitz)	1884; Paris; The Seine, Quai d'Austerlitz		061; More images
Port-en-Bessin. La halle aux poissons	1884; Port-En-Bessin; The Fish Market	Tai Cheung Holdings Ltd.	064; More images
Port-en-Bessin. Le Catel	1884; Port-en-Bessin; The Catel		065; More images
Port-en-Bessin. La vieille tour	1884; Port-en-Bessin; The Old Tower		066; More images
Port-en-Bessin. Le 14 juillet	1884; Port-en-Bessin; The 14th July	Modern Gallery, Saarbrücken	067; More images
Port-en-Bessin. La plage	1884; Port-en-Bessin; The Beach	Thyssen-Bornemisza Museum, Madrid	068; More images
Port-en-Bessin, La Valleuse	1884; Port-en-Bessin; La Valleuse	Kröller-Müller Museum, Otterlo	075; More images
Port-en-Bessin. L'avant-port	1884; Port-en-Bessin; The Outer Harbour		076; More images
Le Pont de Suresnes	1884; Paris; The Suresnes Bridge		077; More images
Grue du charbon. Clichy	1884; Clichy; Coal Crane	Kelvingrove Art Gallery and Museum, Glasgow	079; More images
Rue de la station. Asnières	1884; Asnières; Station Street		080; More images
La grue "L'Union"	1885; The "Union" crane		082a More images
Péniches amarrées	1885; Mooring barges		082b More images
Nature morte. Livre, oranges	1885; Still life with a Book and Oranges	Alte Nationalgalerie, Berlin	083; More images
Quai de la Tournelle, soleil (Notre-Dame, l'île Saint-Louis)	1885; Paris; Notre Dame	Von der Heydt Museum, Wuppertal	086; More images
Quai de la Tournelle, temps gris	1885; Paris; Tournelle quay		087; More images
Paris. Ponton des bains Bailet	1885; Paris; Boats, Bathing pontoon		088a More images
Paris. Quai de la Tournelle	1885; Paris; Tournelle Quay		088b More images
Quai de Saint-Ouen	1885; Paris; Quai de Saint-Ouen		090; More images
Saint-Briac. Le moulin de Pierre Hâlé à saint-Briac	1885; Saint-Briac; The mill		092; More images
Saint-Briac. Les balises	1885; Saint-Briac; The beacons		094; More images
Brise du nord-ouest raide	1885; Saint-Briac; Stiff Northwest Breeze	Private collection	095; More images
Saint-Briac. Le Port Hue	1885; Saint-Briac; The Port Hue	Museum Boijmans Van Beuningen, Rotterdam	098; More images
Saint-Briac. Le Béchet	1885; Saint-Briac; Le Béchet		099; More images
Saint-Briac. La Pomelière	1885; Saint-Briac; La Pomelière		100; More images
Saint-Briac. Cour à la Ville Hue	1885; Saint-Briac; Court at Ville Hue		101; More images
Saint-Briac. D'une fenêtre	1885; Saint-Briac; From a window		102; More images
Saint-Briac. Rivière de Lancieux	1885; Saint-Briac; River of Lancieux		103; More images
Saint-Briac. La croix des marins. Marée haute	1885; Saint-Briac; The Mariners' Cross at High Tide	Dixon Gallery and Gardens	104; More images
Saint-Briac. L'île Agot	1885; Saint-Briac; Agot Island		106; More images
Saint-Briac. La balise le Cheval	1885; Saint-Briac; The Marker Le Cheval		107; More images
Saint-Briac. Château du Guildo	1885; Saint-Briac; Château du Guildo		108; More images
La berge. Asnières	1885; Asnières; The riverbank	Museum of Modern Art, Saitama	109; More images
Les modistes, rue du Caire (apprêteuse et garnisseuse, modes)	1885; The Milliners	Foundation E. G. Bührle	111; More images
L'embranchement de Bois-Colombes	1885; Bois-Colombes; The Junction	Van Gogh Museum, Amsterdam	113; More images
La neige, Bois-Colombes	1886; Bois-Colombes; The Snow		114; More images
La neige. Boulevard de Clichy	1886; Paris; Snow, Boulevard de Clichy	Minneapolis Institute of Art	115; More images
L'embranchement de Bois-Colombes	1886; Bois-Colombes; The Railway Junction	Leeds Art Gallery	116; More images
Les gazomètres de Clichy	1886; Clichy; The Gas Tanks	National Gallery of Victoria, Melbourne	117; More images
Les Andelys. L'île-à-Lucas	1886; Les Andelys; Lucas Island	Minnesota Marine Art Museum, Winona	119; More images
Les Andelys. Château-Gaillard	1886; Les Andelys; Château-Gaillard	Nelson-Atkins Museum of Art, Kansas City	120; More images
Les Andelys. Soleil couchant	1886; Les Andelys; Sunset		121; More images
Les Andelys. Port Morin	1886; Les Andelys; Port Morin		122; More images
Les Andelys. Les laveuses	1886; Les Andelys; The washers		124; More images
Les Andelys. Côte d'aval	1886; Les Andelys; Hillside from Downstream	Art Institute of Chicago	125; More images
Les Andelys. Le quai	1886; Les Andelys; The Quay	Norton Simon Museum, Pasadena, CA	126; More images
Les Andelys. Le pont	1886; Les Andelys; The Bridge		127; More images
Les Andelys. La berge	1886; Les Andelys; Riverbank	Musée d'Orsay, Paris	128; More images
Asnières. Le ponton de la Félicité	1886; Asnières; Pontoon of the Felicity	Van Gogh Museum, Amsterdam	129; More images
Fécamp. Soleil	1886; Fécamp; Sun		131; More images
Fécamp. Temps gris	1886; Fécamp; Grey weather		132; More images
Femme lisant (Femme sous la lampe)	1886; Woman reading	Musée d'Orsay, Paris	133; More images
La neige à Montmartre	1886; Montmartre; Snow		135; More images
La salle à manger (Le déjeuner)	1886; The Dining Room	Kröller-Müller Museum, Otterlo	136; More images
Etude pour La salle à manger (la femme, format vertical)	1886; Study for The Dining Room (vertical)	National Museum of Serbia, Belgrade	138; More images
Etude pour La salle à manger	1886; Study for The Dining Room		139; More images
Asnières, un clipper	1887; Asnières; A Clipper	Museum Barberini, Potsdam	141; More images
Quai de Clichy. Temps gris	1887; Clichy; Quay, Grey weather		142; More images
Quai de Clichy. Soleil	1887; Clichy; Sunlight, Quay	Baltimore Museum of Art	143; More images
Comblat-le-Château. Le peuplier	1887; Comblat-le-Château; The Poplar	Kunsthaus Zürich	144; More images
Comblat-le-Château. Le château	1887; Comblat-le-Château; Castle	Musée des beaux-arts de Liège	146; More images
Comblat-le-Château. Le Pré	1887; Comblat-le-Château; The Meadow	Dallas Museum of Art	147; More images
Comblat-le-Château. La vallée	1887; Comblat-le-Château; The Valley		149; More images
Collioure. Le clocher	1887; Collioure; The Bell Tower	Kröller-Müller Museum, Otterlo	151; More images
Collioure. La plage de la ville	1887; Collioure; The Town Beach	Metropolitan Museum of Art, New York City	153; More images
Collioure. La plage du faubourg	1887; Collioure; The Beach in the Suburb		154; More images
Collioure. Les balancelles	1887; Collioure; The Swings		155; More images
Collioure. Le Mohamed-el-Sadok	1887; Collioure; Le Mohamed-el-Sadok		157; More images
Collioure. La tartane	1887; Collioure; The Tartan		158; More images
Cathédrale d'Anvers	1888; Anvers; The Cathedral		159; More images
Arrière du Tub (Le pont d'Asnières)	1888; Asnières; Stern of the Boat	Private collection	161; More images
Avant du Tub (opus 176)	1888; Asnières; Front of the Tub		162; More images
Portrieux. La jetée, temps gris	1888; Portrieux; The jetty, grey weather	Kröller-Müller Museum, Otterlo	164; More images
Portrieux. Gouverlo	1888; Portrieux; Gourvelo	Hiroshima Museum of Art	165; More images
Portrieux. Les mâts	1888; Portrieux; The Masts	Private collection	166; More images
Portrieux. Le phare	1888; Portrieux; The Lighthouse	Kröller-Müller Museum, Otterlo	167; More images
Portrieux. Les cabines, Opus 185 (Plage de la comtesse)	1888; Portrieux; The Beach of the Countess	Nelson-Atkins Museum of Art, Kansas City	169; More images
Portrieux. Tertre Denis	1888; Portrieux; Tertre Denis	The Phillips Family Collection	171; More images
Portrieux. La houle	1888; Portrieux; The Swell	Staatsgalerie Stuttgart	172; More images
Portrieux. Le port (étude n°2)	1888; Portrieux; The Port	Staatsgalerie Stuttgart	174; More images
Portrieux. La Comtesse	1888; Portrieux; The Beach La Comtesse		177; More images
Place Clichy	1888; Paris; Place Clichy	Metropolitan Museum of Art, New York City	179; More images
Cassis. Cap Lombard	1889; Cassis; Cap Lombard	Kunstmuseum Den Haag	182; More images
Cassis. La jetée	1889; Cassis; The Jetty	Metropolitan Museum of Art, New York City	184; More images
Cassis. Cap Canaille	1889; Cassis; Cap Canaille	Private collection	186; More images
Cassis. Le port	1889; Cassis; Le port		187; More images
Herblay. L'île	1889; Herblay; View of the Seine	Museum of Fine Arts, Boston	188; More images
Herblay. La rive	1889; Herblay; The Riverbank	Private collection	190; More images
Herblay. Temps gris. Saules	1889; Herblay; Grey weather. Willows		191; More images
Herblay. Coucher de soleil	1889; Herblay; Sunset	Kelvingrove Art Gallery and Museum, Glasgow	192; More images
Herblay. Brouillard (Bords de rivière. La Seine à Herblay)	1889; Herblay; Fog	Musée d'Orsay, Paris	196; More images
Un dimanche	1889; Sunday	Private collection	197; More images
Un dimanche (première pensée : étude de l'homme et de la femme)	1889; A Sunday (study)		198; More images
Un dimanche (petite étude de la femme)	1889; A Sunday (study)		199; More images
Un dimanche. L'homme et la femme (étude)	1889; A Sunday (study)		202b More images
Un dimanche. Esquisse n°1 (esquisse finale avec mise au carreau)	1889; A Sunday (study)		204; More images
Saint-Cast. Le port	1890; Saint-Cast; Port	Museum of Fine Arts, Boston	205; More images
Saint-Briac. Les balises	1890; Saint-Briac; The Beacons	Private collection	206; More images
Saint-Briac. La garde Guérin. Saint-Lunaire	1890; Saint-Briac; La garde Guérin. Saint-Lunaire	Arp Museum Bahnhof Rolandseck, Remagen	207; More images
Saint-Briac. Le Port Hue	1890; Saint-Briac; The Port Hue	Pushkin Museum of Fine Arts, Moscow	208; More images
Herblay. Brouillard	1890; Herblay; Fog		209; More images
Herblay. Coucher de soleil	1890; Herblay; Sunset	Kelvingrove Art Gallery and Museum, Glasgow	210; More images
Portrait de Félix Fénéon	1890; Portrait of Félix Fénéon	Museum of Modern Art, New York City	211; More images
Portrait de Félix Fénéon	1890; Portrait de Félix Fénéon (étude)	Private collection	212; More images
Concarneau. Le sardinier	1891; Concarneau; The sardine boat		213; More images
Concarneau. Calme du matin (larghetto)	1891; Concarneau; Morning Calm	Paul G. Allen Collection, Seattle	215; More images
Concarneau. Calme du matin (étude)	1891; Concarneau; Morning Calm (study)		216a More images
Concarneau. Calme du soir (étude)	1891; Concarneau; Evening Calm (study)		216b More images
Concarneau. Calme du soir (allegro maestoso)	1891; Concarneau; Evening Calm	Metropolitan Museum of Art, New York City	217; More images
Concarneau	1891; Concarneau		218; More images
Concarneau, rentrée des chaloupes (presto final)	1891; Concarneau; Regatta in front of	Private collection	219; More images
Concarneau. Pêche à la sardine (adagio)	1891; Concarneau; Sardine Fishing	Museum of Modern Art, New York City	220; More images
Concarneau. (étude)	1891; Concarneau; Study		221; More images
Femme se coiffant (arabesques pour une salle de toilette)	1892; Woman doing her hair	Private collection	222; More images
Saint-Tropez. Pins aux caroubiers	1892; Saint-Tropez; Pines with Carob Trees		224b More images
Soleil couchant sur la ville (Saint-Tropez)	1892; Saint-Tropez; The Town at Sunset	Miyazaki Prefectural Art Museum	225; More images
Soleil couchant sur la ville (étude)	1892; Sunset		226; More images
Portrait de ma mère	1892; Portrait of my mother		228; More images
Saint-Tropez. Le port au soleil couchant	1892; Saint-Tropez; The Port at Sunset	Museum Barberini, Potsdam	229; More images
Maisons du port (Saint-Tropez)	1892; Saint-Tropez; Houses in the Port	Private collection	232; More images
Femmes au puits	1892; Women at the Well	Musée d'Orsay, Paris	234; More images
Femmes au puits - I (composition horizontale)	1892; Women by the Well I	Musée d'Orsay, Paris	235; More images
Femmes au puits - II (les deux femmes)	1892; Women by the Well II	Musée d'Orsay, Paris	236; More images
Femmes au puits - III (composition verticale mise au carreau)	1892; Women by the Well III	Musée d'Orsay, Paris	237a More images
Saint-Tropez, le calme	1892; Saint-Tropez; The Calm		237b More images
Le pin de Bonaventure	1893; The Bonaventure Pine	Museum of Fine Arts, Houston	240; More images
Le pin de Bonaventure (étude, Le pin, Saint-Tropez)	1893; The Bonaventure Pine (study)	Hermitage Museum, Saint Petersburg	241; More images
Tartanes pavoisées (Le port de Saint-Tropez)	1893; Saint-Tropez; Tartans with Flags	Von der Heydt Museum, Wuppertal	242; More images
Les tartanes (étude, Saint-Tropez)	1893; Saint-Tropez; The Tartans	Courtauld Gallery, London	244; More images
Les deux cyprès	1893; Two Cypresses, Mistral	Kröller-Müller Museum, Otterlo	246; More images
Les platanes (place des Lices, Saint-Tropez)	1893; Saint-Tropez; Plane Trees, Place des Lices	Carnegie Museum of Art, Pittsburgh, PA	248; More images
Femme à l'ombrelle	1893; Woman with a Parasol	Musée d'Orsay, Paris	250; More images
Au temps d'harmonie (l'âge d'or n'est pas dans le passé, il est dans l'avenir)	1893; Saint-Tropez; In the Time of Harmony	Town hall of Montreuil, Seine-Saint-Denis	253; More images
Au temps d'harmonie	1893; Saint-Tropez; In the Time of Harmony (study)	Private collection	254; More images
Au temps d'harmonie. L'homme debout	1894; Saint-Tropez; In the Time of Harmony. The Standing Man (study)	Musée de l'Annonciade, Saint-Tropez	255; More images
Au temps d'harmonie. L'homme lisant	1894; Saint-Tropez; In the Time of Harmony. The Man Reading (study)		256; More images
Au temps d'harmonie. La femme	1894; Saint-Tropez; In the Time of Harmony. The Woman (study)		257; More images
Au temps d'harmonie. Le joueur de boules debout	1894; Saint-Tropez; In the Time of Harmony. The Standing Bowler (study)		258; More images
Au temps d'harmonie. Le joueur de boules penché	1894; Saint-Tropez; In the Time of Harmony. The Bent Bowler (study)		259; More images
Au temps d'harmonie. Les lauriers roses	1894; Saint-Tropez; In the Time of Harmony. The Oleanders (study)		263; More images
Au temps d'harmonie. Les iris	1894; Saint-Tropez; In the Time of Harmony. The Irises (study)		264a More images
Au temps d'harmonie. Les coquelicots	1894; Saint-Tropez; In the Time of Harmony. The Poppies (study)		266; More images
Saint-Tropez. Plage de Granier	1894; Saint-Tropez; Granier Beach		267; More images
Saint-Tropez. Coup de vent d'est	1895; Saint-Tropez; East Wind		269; More images
La mer à Saint-Tropez	1895; Saint-Tropez; The Sea		270; More images
Saint-Tropez. Calme	1895; Saint-Tropez; Calm	Wallraf-Richartz-Museum, Cologne	271; More images
Saint-Tropez. Après l'orage	1895; Saint-Tropez; After the Storm		275; More images
Saint-Tropez. Fontaine des Lices	1895; Saint-Tropez; Fountain of the Lices	Guggenheim Museum Bilbao	281; More images
Place des Lices à Saint-Tropez (étude)	1895; Saint-Tropez; Place des Lices (study)		282; More images
Saint-Tropez. La bouée rouge	1895; Saint-Tropez; The Red Buoy	Musée d'Orsay, Paris	284; More images
Saint-Tropez. L'orage	1895; Saint-Tropez; Storm	Musée de l'Annonciade, Saint-Tropez	286; More images
Saint-Tropez. Le phare	1895; Saint-Tropez; The Lighthouse		287; More images
Femme en rose	1895; Woman in pink		289; More images
Le port de Volendam	1896; Volendam; The Port		293; More images
Moulin d'Edam	1896; Edam; The Mill	Museum Barberini, Potsdam	294; More images
Le bassin de Flessingue (vert)	1896; Flushing; The Basin	Pola Museum of Art, Hakone, Japan	296; More images
Bateaux-phares. Flessingue (Le port de Vlissingen, bateaux et phares)	1896; Vlissingen; Lighthouse ships		297; More images
Au temps d'harmonie	1896; In the Time of Harmony (small)	Kasser Mochary Art Foundation, Montclair	298; More images
Saint-Tropez. Coucher de soleil au bois de pins	1896; Saint-Tropez; Sunset at the Pine Wood	Musée de l'Annonciade, Saint-Tropez	299; More images
Soleil couchant sur la ville. Etude	1896; Saint-Tropez; Sunset over the city (study)	Musée de Grenoble	300; More images
Voiles et pins (Le bois de pins)	1896; Sails and pines		303; More images
Saint-Tropez. Le clocher	1896; Saint-Tropez; The Bell Tower	Fondation Bemberg, Toulouse	304; More images
Saint-Tropez. Le portail	1896; Saint-Tropez; The Portal	National Museum of Art of Romania, Bucharest	305; More images
Mont-Saint-Michel. Brume et soleil	1897; Mont-Saint-Michel; Fog and sun	Musée Jacquemart-André, Paris	307; More images
Mont-Saint-Michel. Soleil couchant	1897; Mont Saint-Michel; Setting Sun	Dallas Museum of Art	310; More images
Saint-Tropez. Les pins parasols des Canoubiers	1897; Saint-Tropez; The Umbrella Pines at Canoubiers	Musée de l'Annonciade, Saint-Tropez	313 More images
Saint-Tropez. Route de la Foux (Golfe-Juan)	1897; Golfe-Juan	Worcester Art Museum	314; More images
Saint-Tropez. Pointe de Bertaud	1897; Saint-Tropez; Point of Bertaud		316; More images
Moulin à Edam	1898; Edam; The Mill		317; More images
Capo di Noli	1898 near Genoa; Capo di Noli	Wallraf–Richartz Museum, Cologne	319; More images
Saint-Tropez. La terrasse	1898; Saint-Tropez; The Terrace	National Gallery of Ireland, Dublin	320; More images
Entrée du port de Marseille	1898; Marseille; Entrance to the Port	Kröller-Müller Museum, Otterlo	322; More images
Marseille. Le vieux port. La tour Saint-Jean	1898; Marseille; The Old Port. The Saint-Jean Tower		324; More images
Saint-Tropez. Le phare (soir)	1898; Saint-Tropez; The lighthouse (evening)		325; More images
Bellevue	1899; Bellevue		326; More images
Terrasse de Meudon	1899; Meudon; Terrace		327; More images
Pont de Grenelle	1899; Grenelle; Pont	Amos Rex, Helsinki	328; More images
Entrée du port de Honfleur	1899; Honfleur; Entrance to the Port	Indianapolis Museum of Art	330; More images
Saint-Cloud	1899; Saint-Cloud; The Seine	Museum Folkwang, Essen	331; More images
Le vélodrome	1899; Saint-Cloud; The Velodrome		332; More images
Saint-Tropez, le quai	1899; Saint-Tropez; The Pier	Musée de l'Annonciade, St. Tropez	333; More images
Saint-Tropez, le quai (esquisse)	1899; Saint-Tropez; The Quay (sketch)		334; More images
Ruines de Grimaud	1899; Grimaud; Ruins		335; More images
Le démolisseur	1899; The Wrecker	Musée d'Orsay, Paris	336; More images
Samois. Etude n°1	1899; Samois; The Seine (Study 8661)	Neue Pinakothek, Munich	338; More images
Samois. Etude n°2	1899; Samois; The Seine (Study 8658)	Neue Pinakothek, Munich	339; More images
Samois. Etude n°3	1899; Samois; The Seine (Study 8659)	Neue Pinakothek, Munich	340; More images
Samois. Etude n°4	1899; Samois; The Seine (Study 8660)	Neue Pinakothek, Munich	341; More images
Samois. Etude n°6	1899; Samois (study 6)		343; More images
Samois. Etude n°8 (La Seine)	1899; Samois; Study No. 8	Wallraf–Richartz Museum, Cologne	345; More images
Samois. Etude n°10	1899; Samois; Study No. 10		347; More images
La Seine à Samois. Etude n°13	1899; Samois; Study No. 13, The Seine	Staatsgalerie Stuttgart	350; More images
Mantes	1899; Mantes; The Seine	Kröller-Müller Museum, Otterlo	351; More images
Viaduc d'Auteuil	1899; Auteuil Viaduct		352; More images
Pin de Bertaud	1899; Bertaud pine		354; More images
Esquisse des cinq fenêtres	1900; Sketch of the Five Windows		355; More images
Esquisse du panneau central n°2	1900; Sketch of the Central Panel No.2		356; More images
Esquisse du panneau central n°3	1900; Sketch of the Central Panel No.3		357; More images
Esquisse de la voûte	1900; Sketch of the Vault		358; More images
Saint-Tropez. Le port	1901; Saint-Tropez; The Port	National Museum of Western Art, Tokyo	359; More images
Entrée du port de Saint-Tropez (étude)	1902; Saint-Tropez; Entrance to the Harbour	Sammlung Rosengart Luzern	362; More images
Sortie du port de Saint-Tropez	1901; Saint-Tropez; Leaving the Port		363; More images
Sentier côtier. Saint-Tropez	1901; Saint-Tropez; The Customs Trail	Museum of Grenoble	364; More images
Samois. Brume du matin (le vapeur l'Hirondelle)	1901; L’Hirondelle; Steamer on the Seine	National Gallery Prague	370; More images
Samois. Lumière du soir	1901; Samois; Evening Light	Neue Pinakothek, Munich	371; More images
Samois. Le remorqueur	1901; Samois; The Tugboat in the Canal	Israel Museum, Jerusalem	372; More images
Samois. La berge. Matin	1901; Samois; The Riverbank, Morning	Montreal Museum of Fine Arts	373; More images
Samois. Entrée de l'écluse	1901; Samois; Entrance to the Lock	Ny Carlsberg Glyptotek, Copenhagen	374; More images
Samois. Le chaland	1901; Samois; The Barge		375; More images
Brick italien devant Agay	1901; Agay; Italian brig in front of		376; More images
Castellane	1902; Castellane	Private collection	377; More images
Castellane (étude)	1902; Castellane (study)		378; More images
Sisteron	1902; Sisteron		379; More images
Auxerre. Le pont	1902; Auxerre; The Bridge	Pola Museum of Art, Hakone, Japan	380; More images
Auxerre. La rivière	1902; Auxerre; The River	Unknown	381; More images
Auxerre. Le canal	1902; Auxerre; The Channel	Unknown	382; More images
Saint-Tropez. La ville et les pins	1902; Saint-Tropez; The City and the Pines		383; More images
Paris. La Seine au Trocadéro	1903; Paris; The Seine at the Trocadero		385; More images
La passerelle Debilly	1903; Debilly; Footbridge	Unknown	386; More images
Le pont Mirabeau	1903; Mirabeau; The Bridge	Tel Aviv Museum of Art	389; More images
Antibes. Matin	1903; Antibes; The Morning		394; More images
Antibes. Soir	1903; Antibes; Evening	Private collection	395; More images
Les Diablerets (l'Oldenhorn et le Bécabesson)	1903; The Diablerets	Private collection	396; More images
Le glacier des Diablerets	1903; The Diablerets Glacier	Unknown	397; More images
Saint-Cloud	1903; Saint-Cloud	Private collection	398; More images
Le cabanon (Saint-Tropez)	1903; Saint-Tropez; Le Cabanon	Private collection	399; More images
Le cabanon (étude)	1903; Saint-Tropez; Le Cabanon (study)	Private collection	400; More images
Amandiers roses en fleurs (Arbres en fleurs)	1903; Almond Trees in Bloom	Fondation Bemberg, Toulouse	402; More images
Venise. Matin	1903; Venice; Morning		406; More images
Venise (étude)	1903; Venice; Study		407; More images
Lac Léman (Saint-Gingolph)	1903; Saint-Gingolph; Lake Geneva		408; More images
Venise. Brume rose. Isola di San Giorgio	1904; Venice; Pink mist. Isola di San Giorgio		409; More images
Venise. Voiles dans la brume. Canal de la Giudecca	1904; Venice; Sails in the mist. Giudecca Canal		410; More images
Venise. Mouillage de la Giudecca (La Salute)	1904; Venice; Giudecca anchorage at La Salute	Neue Pinakothek, Munich	411; More images
Venise. La Dogana	1904; Venice; The Customs House		412; More images
Venise. La lagune. La voile jaune	1904; Venice; The Lagoon. The Yellow Sail	Musée des Beaux-Arts et d'Archéologie de Besançon	413; More images
Venise, La voile verte	1904; Venice; The Green Sail	Musée d'Orsay, Paris	414; More images
Venise. Bassin de San Marco	1905; Venice; The Lagoon of Saint Mark	Chrysler Museum of Art, Norfolk, Virginia	415; More images
Venise. La maison verte	1905; Venice; The Green House		417; More images
Venise. Les îles de la lagune	1905; Venice; The Islands of the Lagoon	Fondation Pierre Gianadda	418; More images
Venise. Bragozzo	1905; Venice; Bragozzo		419; More images
Venise. Canal de la Giudecca. Matin	1905; Venice; Giudecca Canal, Morning	Foundation E.G. Bührle Collection, Zürich	420; More images
Saint-Tropez. La tartane	1905; Saint-Tropez; The Tartan		422; More images
Venise. Grand canal	1905; Venice; Grand Canal	Toledo Museum of Art	424; More images
Venise. L'arc-en-ciel	1905; Venice; The Rainbow		425; More images
Saint-Tropez. Sainte-Anne	1905; Saint-Tropez; Saint Anne		426; More images
Saint-Tropez. Bord de mer (Le sentier de douane)	1905; Saint-Tropez; Seaside	Museum of Grenoble	427; More images
Marseille (étude)	1906; Marseille; Study		428; More images
Marseille. Le vieux port	1906; Marseille; The Old Port		430; More images
Marseille. La Bonne mère	1906; Marseilles; Notre-Dame-de-la-Garde	Metropolitan Museum of Art, New York City	433; More images
Rotterdam. La Meuse	1906; Rotterdam; The Meuse		434; More images
Rotterdam. A la remorque (Remorqueur dans le port de Rotterdam)	1906; Rotterdam; Tugboat in the port		435; More images
Rotterdam. Les fumées	1906; Rotterdam; The Steams	Shimane Art Museum, Matsue, Japan	436; More images
Overschie. Le canal	1906; Overschie; Canal	Ohara Museum of Art, Kurashiki, Japan	438; More images
Rotterdam. Le moulin. Le canal. Le matin	1906; Rotterdam; The mill. The canal. The morning	Kröller-Müller Museum, Otterlo	439; More images
Marseille. Le vieux port (Marseille. Le vieux port (brume matinale))	1906; Marseille; The Old Port in Morning Mist		441; More images
Sortie du port de Marseille	1906; Marseille; Exit from the Port	Hermitage Museum, Saint Petersburg	442; More images
Saint-Tropez. La calanque	1906; Saint-Tropez; The Bay	Royal Museums of Fine Arts of Belgium, Brussels	443; More images
Saint-Tropez. Le port (soir). Soleil rouge	1906; Saint-Tropez; The Port (Evening). Red Sun		446; More images
Rotterdam. Le port	1907; Rotterdam; The Port	Museum Boijmans Van Beuningen, Rotterdam	448; More images
La Corne d'or. Brume	1907; Constantinople; The Golden Horn. Mist		449; More images
La Corne d'or. La Suleimanie	1907; Constantinople; The Golden Horn. The Suleimania		450; More images
La Corne d'or. Sainte-Sophie	1907; Constantinople; The Golden Horn. The Sainte-Sophie		451; More images
La Corne d'or. Les caïques	1907; Constantinople; The Golden Horn. The Caiques	Museum of Art in Łódź	452; More images
La Corne d'or. Le pont	1907; Constantinople; The Golden Horn. The Bridge		453; More images
Constantinople, La Corne d'Or. Les minarets	1907; Constantinople; The Golden Horn, the Minarets		454; More images
Constantinople, La Corne d'Or, Matin	1907; Constantinople; The Golden Horn, Morning	Musée des beaux-arts de Marseille	457; More images
Marseille. Barques de pêche	1907; Marseille; Fishing Boats	Musée de l'Annonciade, Saint-Tropez	459; More images
Marseille. Bateaux de pêche	1907; Marseille; Fishing Boats		460; More images
Saint-Tropez. La baie	1907; Saint-Tropez; The Bay		461; More images
Marseille. La bonne mère (étude)	1907; Marseille; Notre-Dame-de-la-Garde (study)		463; More images
La Corne d'or (Constantinople)	1907; Constantinople; The Golden Horn		464; More images
Venise. Voiles	1908; Venice; Sails		465; More images
Venise. Mouillage à la Giudecca (La Salute)	1908; Venice; Anchorage at Giudecca (La Salute)	Miyazaki Prefectural Art Museum	466; More images
Venise. Mouillage à la Giudecca	1908; Venice; Anchorage at Giudecca		467; More images
Venise. San Giorgio	1908; Venice; Saint-Georges	Asahi Breweries	469; More images
Venise. La Dogana	1908; Venice; La Dogana		470; More images
Venise. Brume	1908; Venice; The Fog	Landesmuseum Hannover	471; More images
Venise. Le Redentore	1908; Venice; The Redentore		472; More images
Venise. La Salute. Vert	1908; Venice; The Salute, Green	Private Collection	473; More images
Port de Gênes	1909; Genoa; Port	Private Collection	476; More images
Vérone. La place aux herbes	1909; Verona; The Herb Square		477; More images
Le pin de Bertaud (Le pin, Saint-Tropez)	1909; Saint-Tropez; Bertaud's Pine	Pushkin Museum of Fine Arts, Moscow	478; More images
Antibes. Route du cap	1909; Antibes; Cape Route		479; More images
Avignon. Matin	1909; Avignon; Morning		480; More images
Avignon. Soir (Le palais des papes)	1909; Avignon; The Papal Palace	Musée d'Orsay, Paris	481; More images
Venise. Mouillage à la Giudecca (Le nuage rose)	1909; Venice; Anchorage at Giudecca. The Pink Cloud	Albertina, Vienna	482; More images
Constantinople	1909; Constantinople		483; More images
Le phare d'Antibes	1909; Antibes; The Lighthouse	Musée d'Arts de Nantes	486; More images
La Passe de Marseille	1910; The Marseille Pass	Private collection	488; More images
Antibes. Les tours	1911; Antibes; The Towers	Albertina, Vienna	490; More images
Sortie du port de La Rochelle	1912; La Rochelle; Leaving the harbour	Johannesburg Art Gallery	491; More images
Le pont des Arts	1912; Paris; The Bridge of Arts	Museum Folkwang, Essen	493; More images
La Rochelle. Arc-en-ciel. Le port	1912; La Rochelle; Rainbow, the Port		494; More images
La Rochelle. Les tours vertes	1913; La Rochelle; The Green Towers		495; More images
Le Pont-neuf	1913; Paris; The Pont Neuf		497; More images
Marseille, La Tour Rose	1913; Marseille; The Pink Tower	Museum Folkwang, Essen	498; More images
Antibes. L'eucalyptus	1913; Antibes; The Eucalyptus		499; More images
Antibes. Soir	1914; Antibes; The Evening	Strasbourg Museum of Modern and Contemporary Art	500; More images
Antibes. Matin	1914; Antibes; Morning	National Museum, Warsaw	501; More images
Juan-les-Pins. Soir	1914; Juan-les-Pins. Evening		502; More images
La Rochelle. Le bassin à flots (n°1)	1915; La Rochelle; The Water Basin 1	Musée des Beaux-Arts de Nancy	505; More images
La Rochelle. Le bassin à flots (n°2)	1916; La Rochelle; The Water Basin 2		506; More images
Antibes. Les bricks-goélettes	1916; Antibes; Les bricks-goélettes		507; More images
Antibes. Le nuage rose	1916; Antibes; The Pink Cloud	Museum of Fine Arts, Boston	509; More images
Antibes. La pinède	1917; Antibes; The Pine Grove		514; More images
Antibes. Petit port de Bacon	1917; Antibes; Bacon's small harbour		515; More images
Antibes. Petit port de Bacon	1917; Antibes; Bacon's small harbour	Finnish National Gallery, Helsinki	516; More images
Nature morte. Poivron. Aubergine	1918; Still Life. Pepper. Aubergine		517; More images
Nature morte. Coing et oranges	1918; Still Life. Quince and Oranges		518; More images
Cannes. Le vieux port	1918; Cannes; The Old Port		519; More images
Antibes, Le Musior, le port	1918; Antibes; The Musior, the harbour		520; More images
Cannes. Les allées	1918; Cannes; The Alleys		521; More images
Antibes. Matin	1918; Antibes; Morning		523; More images
Antibes. Couchant rouge	1918; Antibes; Red sunset		524; More images
Antibes. Couchant jaune	1918; Antibes; Yellow Sunset		525; More images
Antibes. Orage	1918; Antibes; Storm		526; More images
1918 Antibes. Vent d'est	1918; Antibes; East Wind		527; More images
Antibes. Brume du matin	1918; Antibes; Morning Mist		528; More images
Antibes. Temps gris	1918; Antibes; Gray Wheather		529; More images
Antibes (étude)	1919; Antibes; Study		531; More images
Antibes. Orage	1919; Antibes; Storm	Albertina, Vienna	533; More images
Antibes. Matin (Cap d'Antibes)	1919; Antibes; Morning, Cap d'Antibes		534; More images
Antibes. Temps gris	1919; Antibes; Gray Weather		536; More images
Anémones	1919; Antibes; Anemones		538; More images
Le pot vert	1919; Antibes; The Green Pot		539; More images
Le Mont-Blanc (orangé rose)	1920; Mont Blanc pink orange	Musée Cantini, Marseilles	544; More images
Les Andelys, Château-Gaillard	1921; Les Andelys; Château-Gaillard		547; More images
Le Petit Andelys (aval)	1921; Les Andelys; The Small, Downstream		548; More images
Entrée du port de La Rochelle	1921; La Rochelle; Entrance of the Harbor	Musée d'Orsay, Paris	549; More images
Marseille. La brume jaune	1922; Marseille; The Yellow Mist	Musée d'Orsay, Paris	551; More images
Bateaux au mouillage à Locmalo	1922; Locmalo; Boats at anchor		552; More images
Locmalo, Le Sardinier	1922; Locmalo; The Sardinian		553; More images
Groix. Les thoniers, soleil couchant	1922; Groix; The Tuna Boats, Sunset		554; More images
La Rochelle. La tour des Quatre-sergents. L'épi	1922; La Rochelle; The Quatre-sergents Tower. The Spur		555; More images
Les Andelys. Matin. Eté	1923; Les Andelys; Morning. Summer		557; More images
Venise. La Dogana	1923; Venice; La Dogana		558; More images
Jardin à Saint-Paul	1923; Garden in Saint-Paul		561; More images
La bénédiction des thoniers à Groix	1923; Groix; Blessing of the Tuna Fleet	Minneapolis Institute of Art	562; More images
Marseille. Le bateau d'oranges	1923; Marseille; The orange boat	Matsuoka Museum of Art, Tokyo, Japan	563; More images
Le pont de Lézardrieux	1925; Lézardrieux; The Bridge		567; More images
Le phare. Groix	1925; Groix; The Lighthouse	Metropolitan Museum of Art, New York City	568; More images
Le pont des Arts	1925; Paris; The Pont des Arts		569; More images
Concarneau, Le port	1925; Concarneau; The Port	Artizon Museum, Tokyo	571; More images
Le Pont-Royal. Inondations	1926; Paris; Flood at the Pont Royal		572; More images
La Rochelle. Tour des Quatre-sergents	1927; La Rochelle; The Tower of the Four Sergeants		573; More images
La Seine à Boulogne	1927; Boulogne; The Seine		574; More images
Le Pont de Bourg-Saint-Andéol	1927; Bourg-Saint-Andéol; The Bridge		575; More images
Le chenal de La Rochelle	1927; La Rochelle; The Channel		576; More images
Le thonier entrant à La Rochelle (couchant)	1927; La Rochelle; The Tuna Boat entering at sunset		577; More images
La Rochelle. Le phare	1927; La Rochelle; The Lighthouse		578; More images
Saint-Malo. Bassin à flots	1927; Saint-Malo; River Basin		579; More images
Le pont des Arts, automne	1928; Paris; The Bridge of Arts, Autumn	Musée Carnavalet, Paris	582; More images
Vert-Galant, Le jardin	1928; Vert-Galant; The Garden	Private collection	583; More images
Viviers, Le Pont	1928; Viviers; The Bridge	Private collection	584; More images
Fleurs (tulipes)	1928; Flowers (tulips)	Private collection	585; More images
Fleurs (tulipes en pots)	1928; Flowers (tulips in pots)	Private collection	586; More images
Saint-Malo. Le pardon des terre-neuvas	1928; Saint-Malo; The Pardon of the Newfoundlander	Musée d'Histoire de Saint-Malo	587; More images
L'Odet à Quimper	1929; Quimper; The River Odet		590; More images
Pont-Royal, automne	1929; Paris; Pont-Royal, Autumn		591; More images
Pont des arts, Inondation	1930; Paris; Pont des arts, Flooding	Private collection	593; More images
Saint-Malo. Trois-mâts terre-neuvas. Voiles au sec	1931; Saint-Malo; Three-masted Newfoundlanders. Dry sails	Private collection	595; More images
Barfleur	1931; Barfleur	Private collection	596; More images
Paris. Le Pont-Neuf	1931; Paris; The Pont-Neuf	Hiroshima Museum of Art	597; More images
Le phare de Gatteville	1931; Gatteville; The Lighthouse	Musée Thomas-Henry, Cherbourg-en-Cotentin	603; More images
Cherbourg. Fort du Roule	1932; Cherbourg; Fort du Roule	Montreal Museum of Fine Arts	604; More images
Canal Saint-Martin	1933; Saint-Martin Canal		606; More images
Concarneau. Le port	1933; Concarneau; The Harbour	Wallraf–Richartz Museum, Cologne	607; More images
Pont-Marie	1933; Pont-Marie		608; More images
L'île de la Cité	1934; Paris; The Ile de la Cité	Private collection	609; More images
Marseille. Le port	1934; Marseille; The Port	Private collection	611; More images
	1935; Paris; Death		

== Museums ==
- Albertina, Vienna
- Alte Nationalgalerie, Berlin
- Amos Rex, Helsinki
- Artizon Museum, Tokyo
- Art Institute of Chicago
- Asahi Breweries
- Baltimore Museum of Art
- Carnegie Museum of Art, Pittsburgh, PA
- Chrysler Museum of Art, Norfolk, Virginia
- Courtauld Gallery, London
- Dallas Museum of Art
- Dixon Gallery and Gardens, Memphis, Tennessee
- Fondation Bemberg, Toulouse
- Finnish National Gallery, Helsinki
- Fondation Pierre Gianadda, Martigny, Switzerland
- Foundation E. G. Bührle
- Guggenheim Museum Bilbao
- Hermitage Museum, Saint Petersburg
- Hiroshima Museum of Art
- Indianapolis Museum of Art
- Israel Museum, Jerusalem
- Johannesburg Art Gallery
- Kasser Mochary Art Foundation, Montclair
- Kelvingrove Art Gallery and Museum, Glasgow
- Kröller-Müller Museum, Otterlo
- Kunstmuseum Basel
- Kunstmuseum Den Haag
- Kunsthaus Zürich
- Landesmuseum Hannover
- Leeds Art Gallery
- Matsuoka Museum of Art, Tokyo, Japan
- Metropolitan Museum of Art, New York City
- Minneapolis Institute of Art
- Minnesota Marine Art Museum, Winona
- Miyazaki Prefectural Art Museum
- Modern Gallery, Saarbrücken
- Montreal Museum of Fine Arts
- Musée Cantini, Marseilles
- Musée Carnavalet, Paris
- Musée d'Arts de Nantes
- Musée d'Histoire de Saint-Malo
- Musée des beaux-arts de Liège (in French)
- Musée des beaux-arts de Marseille
- Musée d'Orsay, Paris
- Musée de l'Annonciade, Saint-Tropez (in French)
- Musée Jacquemart-André, Paris
- Musée Thomas-Henry, Cherbourg-en-Cotentin
- Museum Barberini, Potsdam
- Museum Boijmans Van Beuningen, Rotterdam
- Museum Folkwang, Essen
- Museum of Art in Łódź
- Museum of Fine Arts, Boston
- Museum of Fine Arts, Houston
- Museum of Grenoble
- Museum of Modern Art, New York City
- Museum of Modern Art, Saitama (in Japanese)
- National Gallery of Ireland, Dublin
- National Gallery of Victoria, Melbourne
- National Gallery Prague
- National Museum of Art of Romania, Bucharest
- National Museum of Serbia, Belgrade
- National Museum of Western Art, Tokyo
- National Museum, Warsaw
- Nelson-Atkins Museum of Art, Kansas City
- Norton Simon Museum, Pasadena, CA
- Ny Carlsberg Glyptotek, Copenhagen
- Ohara Museum of Art, Kurashiki, Japan
- Paul G. Allen Collection, Seattle (in French)
- Pola Museum of Art, Hakone, Japan
- Pushkin Museum, Moscow
- Rosengart Collection Museum, Luzern
- Royal Museums of Fine Arts of Belgium, Brussels
- Shimane Art Museum, Matsue, Japan
- Staatsgalerie Stuttgart
- Strasbourg Museum of Modern and Contemporary Art
- Tel Aviv Museum of Art
- Town hall of Montreuil, Seine-Saint-Denis
- Thyssen-Bornemisza Museum, Madrid
- Toledo Museum of Art
- Van Gogh Museum, Amsterdam
- Von der Heydt Museum, Wuppertal
- Wallraf-Richartz-Museum, Cologne
- Worcester Art Museum

== See also ==
- Cassis, Cap Lombard, Opus 196 (1889)
- Opus 217. Against the Enamel of a Background Rhythmic with Beats and Angles, Tones, and Tints, Portrait of M. Félix Fénéon in 1890 (1890)
- Capo di Noli (1898)
- Entrance to the Grand Canal (1905)
- The Lagoon of Saint Mark, Venice (1905)
- Le Sentier des Douanes (1905)
- The Port of Marseille (1907)
