= Claude Thomassin =

French bow maker

Claude Auguste Thomassin (French pronunciation: [klod tɔmasɛ̃]; born 7 August 1865 in Mirecourt; died 29 July 1942 in Tribaldou) was a French bow maker, or archetier.

== Biography ==
Son of Théophile Thomassin (saddle maker) and of Auguste Joséphine Bellaire, he serve his apprenticeship with C. N. Bazin in Mirecourt. In his early career, he worked for the shop of Gand & Bernadel. Many bows from this period are stamped "Gand & Bernadel". In 1901 the family firm of Gand & Bernadel was taken over by Caressa & Français. It was at this point that Claude Thomassin set up his own atelier at 37 Rue de Paradis in Paris. Although he continued to produce some bows for his former employers, much of his output from 1901 onwards was branded with his name "Claude Thomassin" or sometimes "C.Thomassin à Paris". He was Louis Thomassin's first Cousin and not his son as many books incorrectly report. Claude Thomassin has been called one of the best makers of his generation. Richard Otto Gläsel worked for Claude Thomassin as his assistant for a few years until the onset of WWI.

"C. Thomassin's work is highly prized and respected for playability and beautiful workmanship" – Filimonov Fine Violins

"Claude Thomassin provided bows for: John & Arthur BEARE, Gustave BERNARDEL, Léon BERNARDEL, CARESSA & FRANCAIS, GAND & BERNARDEL, GAND & BERNARDEL Frère, Alfred JACQUOT, Paul JOMBAR, Emile LAURENT, Emile LHUMBERT, Paul SERDET, Hippolyte Chrétien SILVESTRE and A. VIDOUDEZ." - Gennady Filimonov
