= Opus 217. Against the Enamel of a Background Rhythmic with Beats and Angles, Tones, and Tints, Portrait of M. Félix Fénéon in 1890 =

Painting by Paul Signac

- Opus 217. Sur l'émail d'un fond rythmique de mesures et d'angles, de tons et de teintes, Portrait de M. Félix Fénéon en 1890 (French)
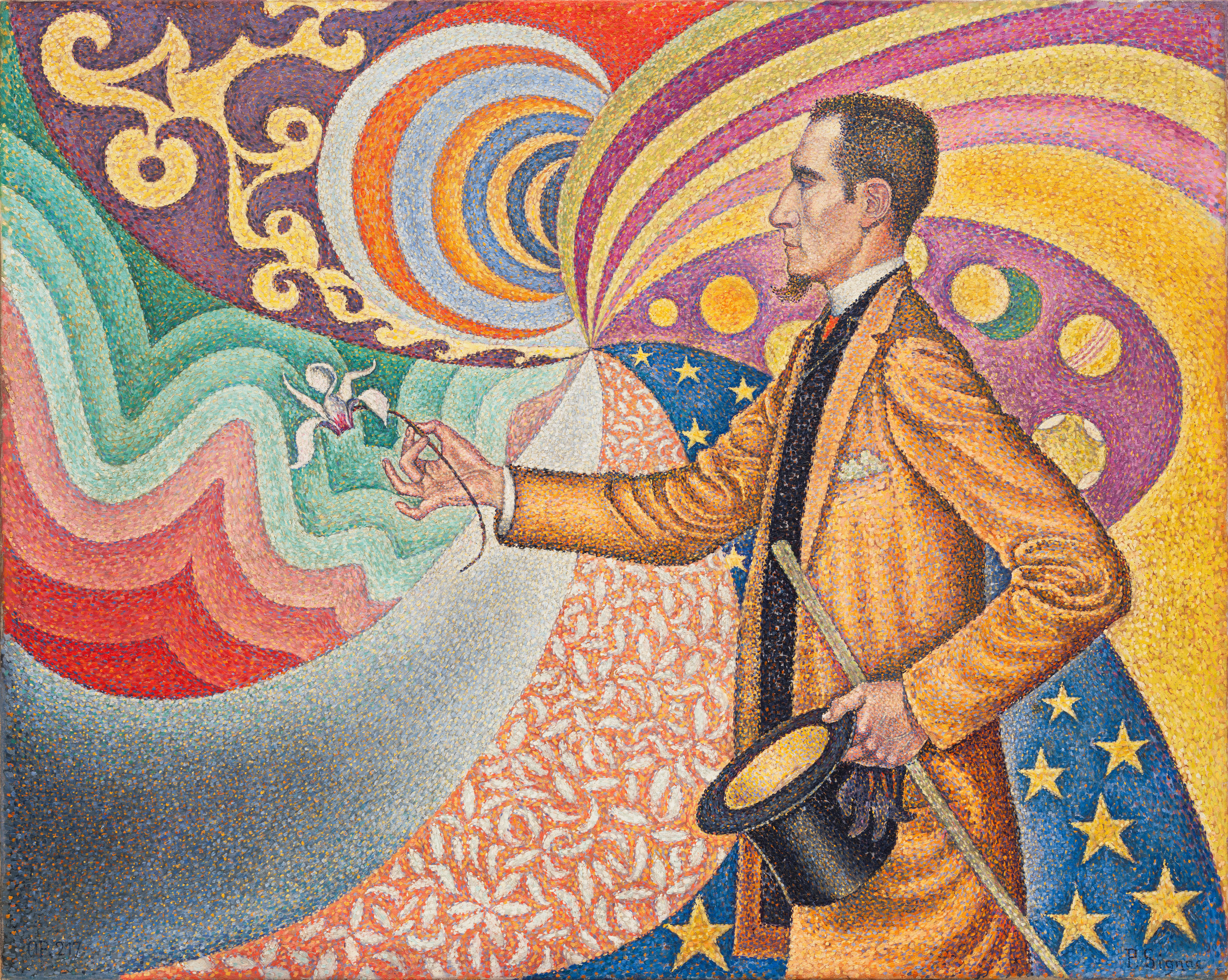
- Artist: Paul Signac
- Year: 1890
- Catalogue: 78734
- Dimensions: 73.5 cm × 92.5 cm (28.9 in × 36.4 in)
- Location: Museum of Modern Art; New York City
- Accession: 85.1991

Opus 217. Against the Enamel of a Background Rhythmic with Beats and Angles, Tones, and Tints, Portrait of M. Félix Fénéon in 1890 (French: Opus 217. Sur l'émail d'un fond rythmique de mesures et d'angles, de tons et de teintes, Portrait de M. Félix Fénéon en 1890) is an oil-on-canvas painting by French Neo-impressionist artist Paul Signac, created in 1890. The work depicts the French art critic Félix Fénéon standing in front of a swirling, kaleidoscope background. It has been in Museum of Modern Art in New York since 1991, having been donated by Mr. and Mrs. David Rockefeller.

== Background ==
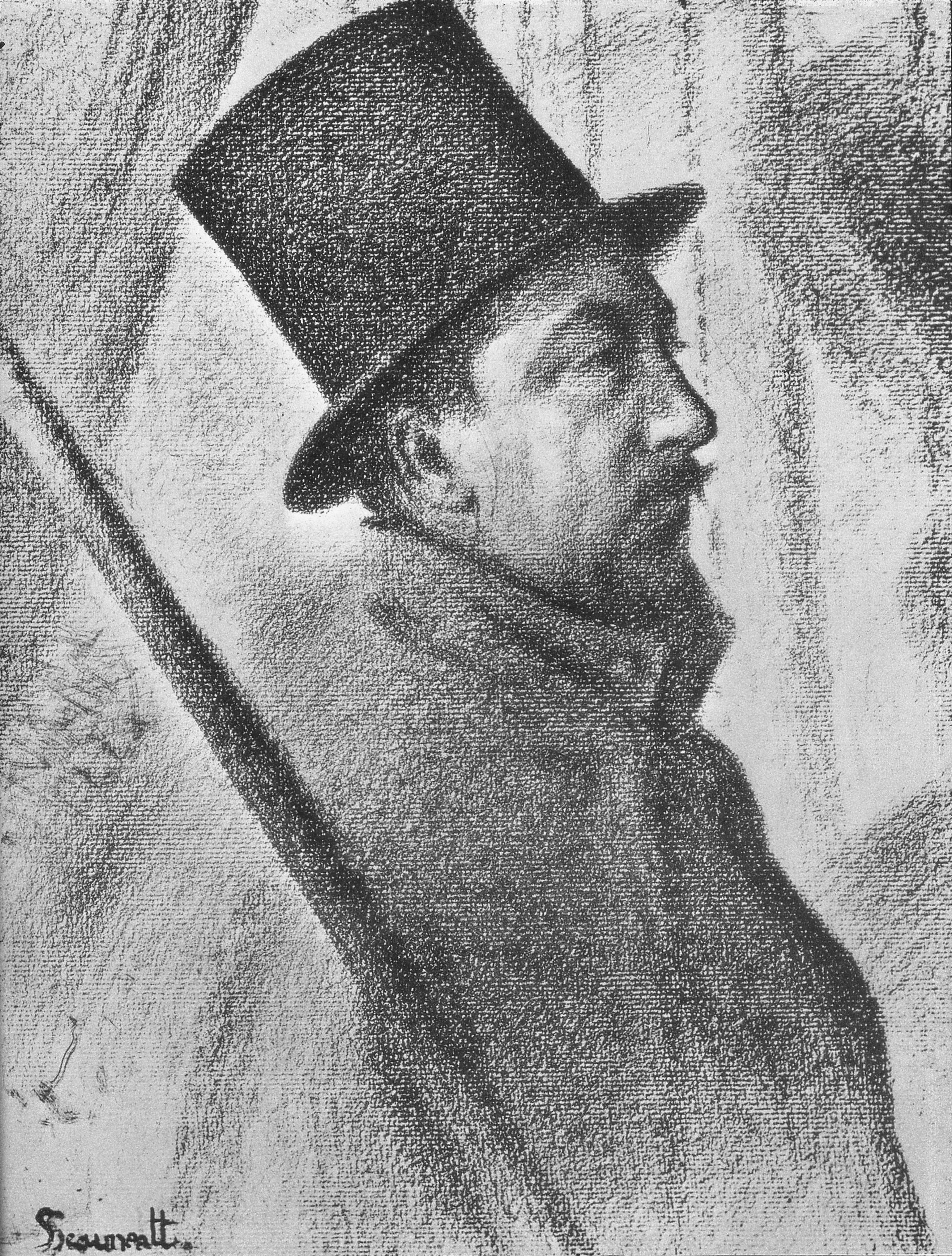
Georges Seurat. Portrait of Paul Signac. 1890. Private collection.

=== Motives ===
Signac decided to invite Fénéon for a portrait as an expression of gratitude to Fénéon. Additionally, the portrait enabled Signac to display his take on Neo-Impressionism, incorporating Henry's recent concepts about the rhythms of colors and lines while synthesizing elements like sensation, sound, music, motion, lines, light, and color.

=== Conception ===
Signac and Fénéon started to exchange letters about the portrait in June 1890. By September 1890, Signac had envisioned a concept for the painting and invited Fénéon to come over and sit for sketches.

== Creation ==
Signac rapidly created the work, relying on three preparatory studies: an oil sketch of the entire composition on wood, a small profile sketch of the head, and a gouache study of the dynamic background. These foundational drawings facilitated the execution of the painting.

The intriguing background of the portrait draws directly from Signac's own collection of Japanese prints, as identified by his granddaughter Françoise Cachin. While exploring these prints, she connected the swirling patterns in the painting to a page from an album of colored woodblock designs, likely from kimono textiles. This nod to East Asian art aligns with Fénéon's appreciation for Japanese prints, which had led his friends to call him "UtagawaFénéon."

== Composition and analysis ==
The work is a left profile portrait of Fénéon, with his characteristic goatee beard, wearing a brown coat with black suit and white shirt, holding a black top hat and walking cane in his left hand, and delicately a cyclamen flower in the fingers of his outstretched right hand. The angles of Fénéon's head, arm, elbow, and cane, create a zigzag pattern down the right hand side of the painting, while the curved stem and petals of the flower echo the upward curve of Fénéon's goatee.

The artwork is a tribute to Henry's concept of "continual-genesis," which refers to the endless creative force of the arabesque design. This decorative pattern, along with its variations such as the meander, spiral, and zigzag, is prevalent across various cultures and is a common element in both tribal and ornamental art. In Opus 217, the contours of Fénéon's nose, elbow, and walking stick form a sequence of zigzag lines.

== Comments and influence ==
When Opus 217 was exhibited in 1891, it sparked varied and critical reactions from the art community. Gustave Geffroy admitted to being baffled by the painting, while Emile Verhaeren criticized its "cold and dry" nature, preferring Signac's landscapes. Jules Antoine found the portrait "curious" and felt the background overwhelmed Félix Fénéon's figure. Camille Pissarro described it as "bizarre," lacking both decorative and emotional appeal. Even Fénéon himself was not pleased with the painting, though his view may have been influenced by modesty.

== See also ==
- List of paintings by Paul Signac
- The Museum's Catalogue entry
- 1890 in art
