= The Inventor Crazybrains and His Wonderful Airship =

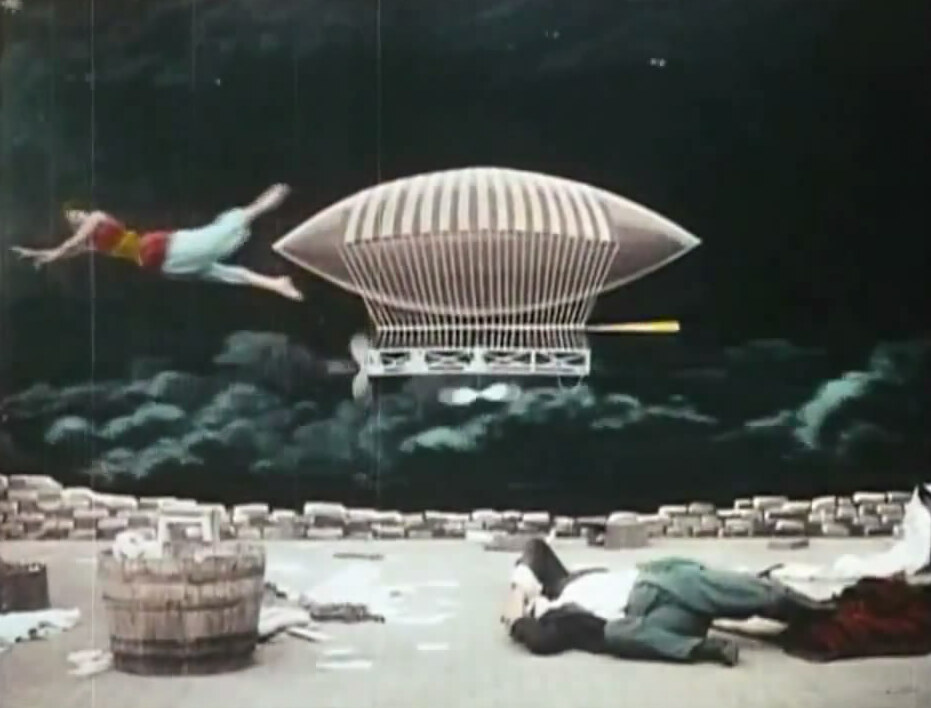
- The inventor Crazybrains dreams of his airship in a frame from the film
- Directed by: Georges Méliès
- Starring: Georges Méliès
- Production company: Star Film Company
- Release date: 1905
- Country: France
- Language: Silent

Le Dirigeable fantastique ou le Cauchemar d'un inventeur, released in the US as The Inventor Crazybrains and His Wonderful Airship and in the UK as Fantastical Air Ship, is a 1905 French short silent film directed by Georges Méliès. The film was released by Méliès's Star Film Company and is numbered 786–788 in its catalogues.

== Plot ==
The Inventor Crazybrains and His Wonderful Airship (1905)

In his ramshackle lodgings, decorated with designs of famous airships of the past, the inventor Crazybrains dances with glee at having designed a new dirigible. When he takes a nap, impish figures appear in his room, gleefully wreaking havoc with his papers before giving way to a vision of Crazybrains's new airship rising aloft above the rooftops. The airship travels through the clouds, and women reclining in painterly positions appear in the sky. Suddenly a fireball strikes the airship, and it explodes with much fire and smoke as the impish figures reappear. Crazybrains, waking up from his nightmare, tears around his room in a frenzy, knocking the plans for the airship down to the floor.

== Themes ==
Le Dirigeable fantastique is one of numerous Méliès films, like A Trip to the Moon and The Impossible Voyage, featuring a comically eccentric scientist. As featured by Méliès, the character is connected both to the Faust legend (a favourite theme of the filmmaker's) as well as to the long-lasting film tradition of the mad scientist figure. Similarly parodic depictions of scientific practitioners also feature in other early films, such as the Edison Manufacturing Company's 1910 A Trip to Mars.

== Release and survival ==
A hand-coloured print of the film, probably from Elisabeth Thuillier's colouring laboratory, survives at the EYE Film Institute Netherlands. It was given a restoration in 1991.
