= Félix Fénéon =

French anarchist and art critic (1861–1944)

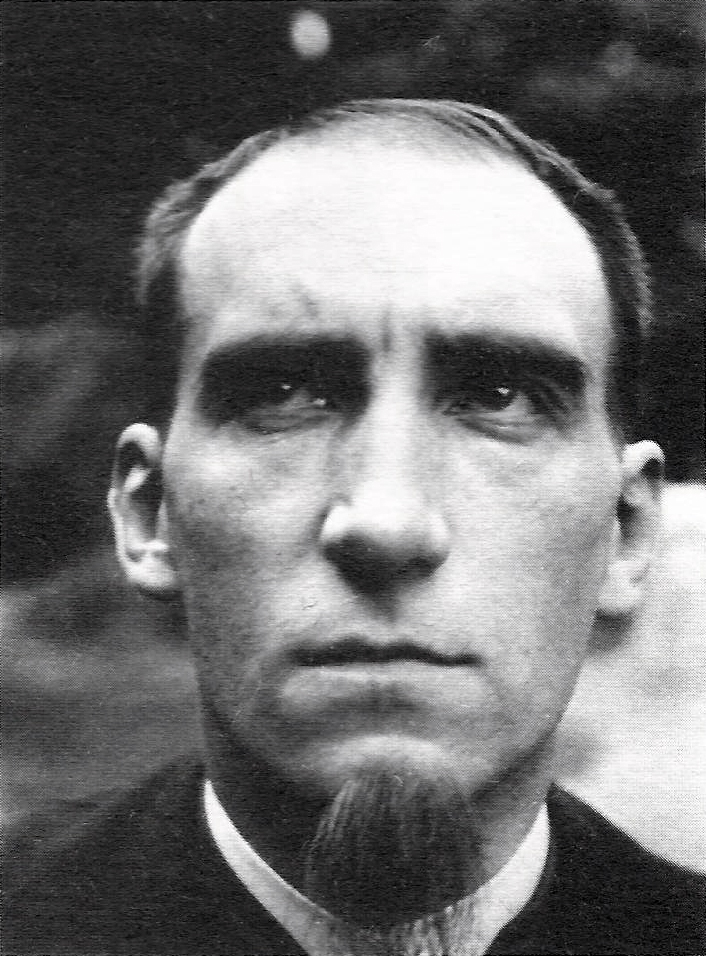
- Félix Fénéon, c. 1900
- Born: 22 June 1861; Turin, Kingdom of Italy
- Died: 29 February 1944 (aged 82); Châtenay-Malabry, France
- Occupations: art critic, art gallery director, writer

Signature
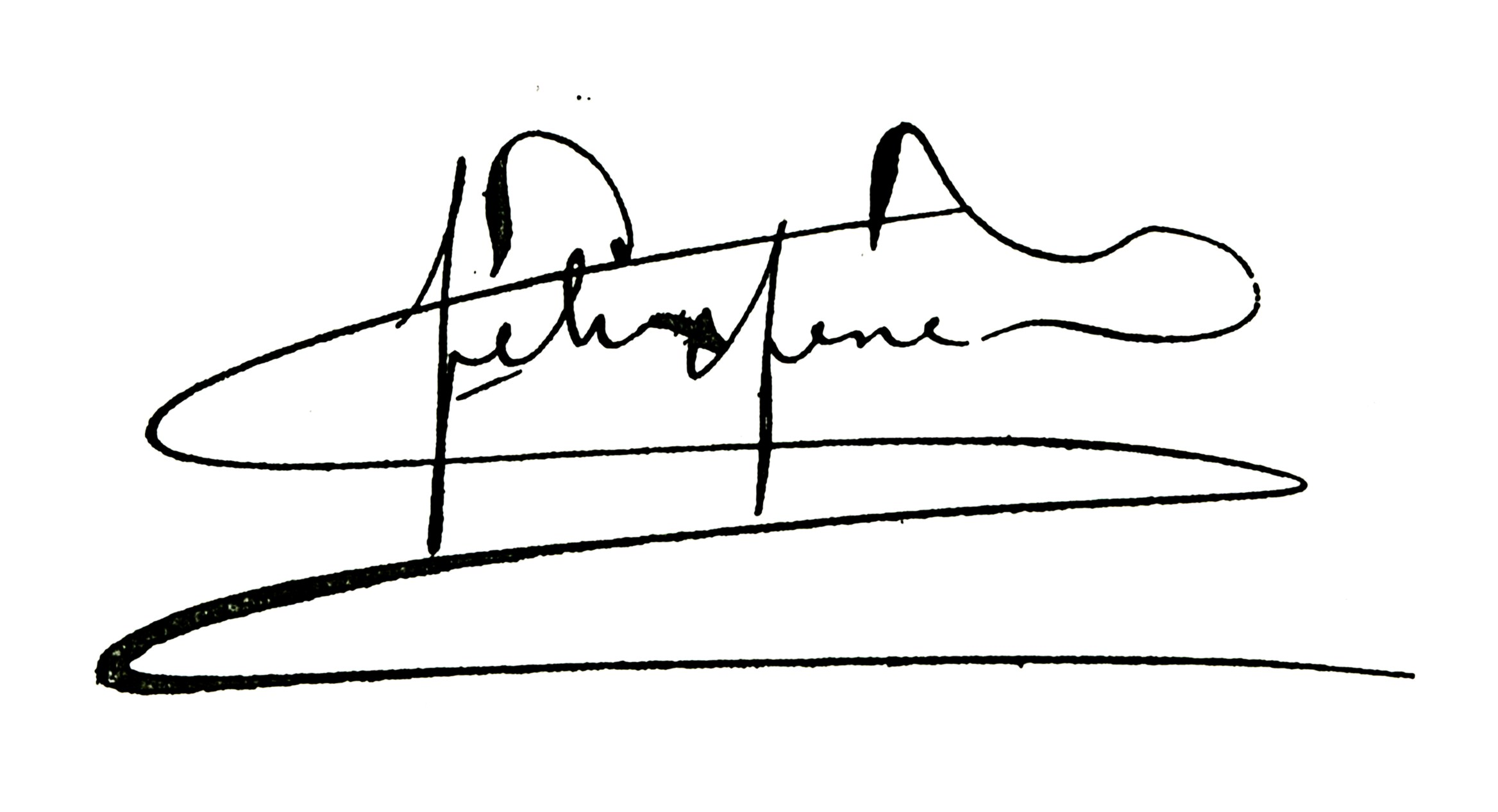

Félix Fénéon (French: [feli feneɔ̃]; 22 June 1861 – 29 February 1944) was a French art critic, gallery director, writer and anarchist during the late 19th century and early 20th century. He coined the term Neo-Impressionism in 1886 to identify a group of artists led by Georges Seurat, and ardently promoted them.

The Fénéon Prize was established in 1949 by his wife, Fanny Goubaux, from the proceeds of the sale of his art collection.

== Early life ==
Fénéon was born in Turin, Italy in 1861 to Marie-Louise Jacquin (a Swiss schoolteacher) and Pierre Marie Jules Félix Fénéon (a French salesman). He was raised in Burgundy and educated at the Lycée Lamartine in Mâcon, passing the baccalauréat. After placing first in the civil service competitive examination for entry to the Ministry of War, Fénéon moved to Paris at the age of twenty and achieved the rank of chief clerk. During his time there he edited many literary works, including those of Rimbaud and Lautréamont, and helped to advance the fledgling pointillist movement under Georges Seurat. He was a regular at Mallarmé's salons on Tuesday evenings, and active in anarchist circles.

== Political activity ==
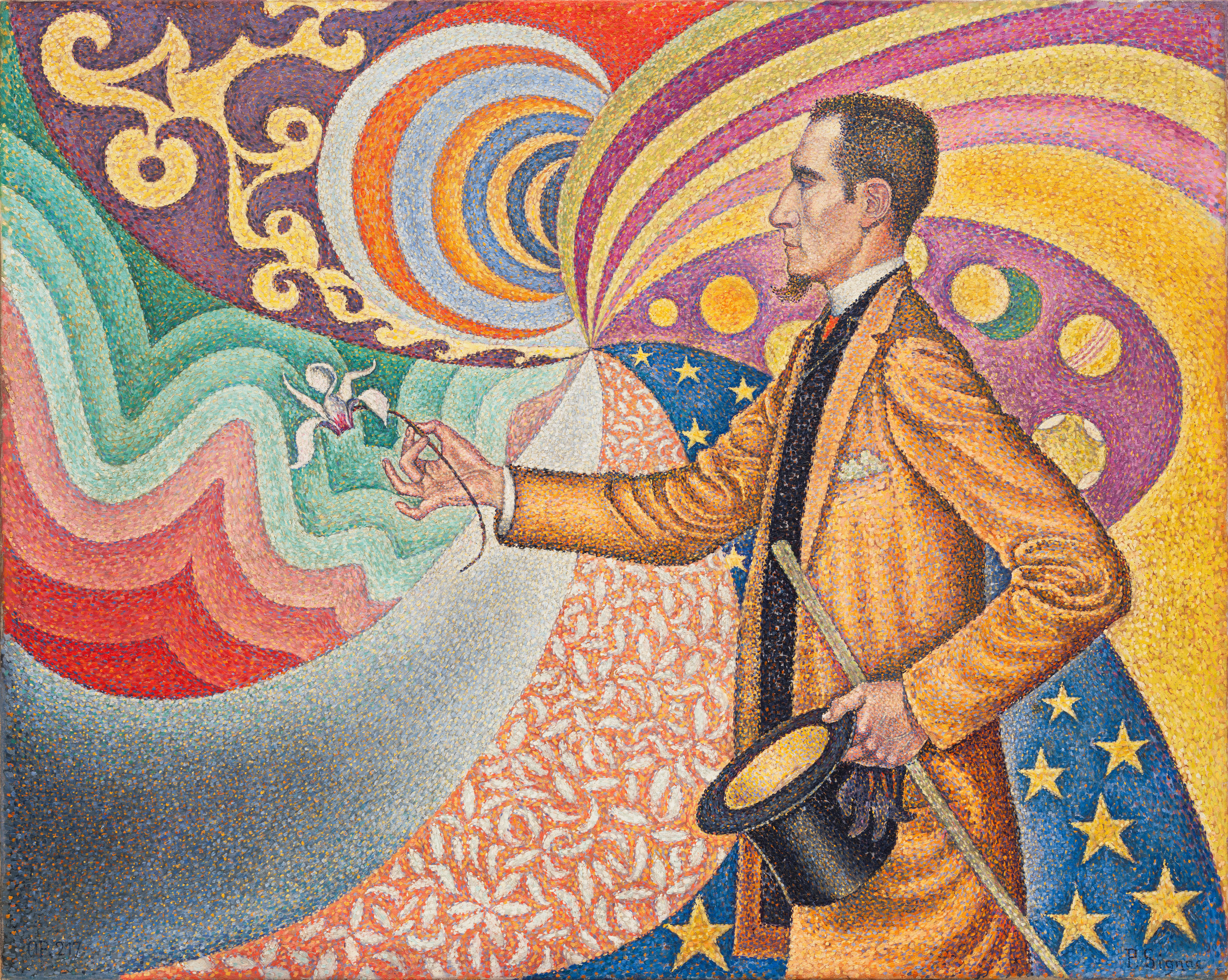
Paul Signac, Portrait of Félix Fénéon, 1890, Museum of Modern Art, New York City

Fénéon worked for 13 years at the War Office while remaining heavily active in supporting anarchist circles and movements. In March 1892, French police talked about Fénéon as an "active Anarchist", and they had him shadowed.

In 1894, Fénéon was arrested on suspicion of conspiracy because of an anarchist bombing of the Foyot restaurant, a popular haunt of politicians. He was also suspected of being connected with the assassination of the French President, Sadi Carnot, by an Italian anarchist. He and twenty-nine others were arrested on charges of conspiracy in what became known as the Trial of the Thirty. Fénéon was acquitted with many of the original thirty. However, the trial was a high point in publicity for Fénéon, normally behind the scenes, as he championed his wit to the amusement of the jury. Of the courtroom scene, Julian Barnes writes, "When the presiding judge put it to him that he had been spotted talking to a known anarchist behind a gas lamp, he replied coolly: Can you tell me, Monsieur le Président, which side of a gas lamp is its behind?"

== Career ==
After the trial, Fénéon became even more elusive. In 1890 the Neo-Impressionist Paul Signac asked permission to produce a portrait of the lauded critic. Fénéon refused several times before agreeing, on the condition that Signac produced a full face effigy. Signac refused, painting instead a famous profile of Fénéon with his characteristic goatee, a picture that became a well-known symbol of the anarchist movement, spawning many variations. Fénéon, though displeased, hung the picture on his wall until Signac's death 45 years later.

Aside from Novels in Three Lines that first appeared as clippings in the Parisian liberal newspaper Le Matin in 1906 and later as a collection, only because his mistress Camille Pateel had collected them in an album, Fénéon published only a 43-page monograph in Les Impressionists (1886). When asked to produce Novels in Three Lines as a collection, Fénéon famously replied with an angry "I aspire only to silence". As Lucy Sante points out, Fénéon, one might say, is invisibly famous, having affected so much without being recognizable to many.

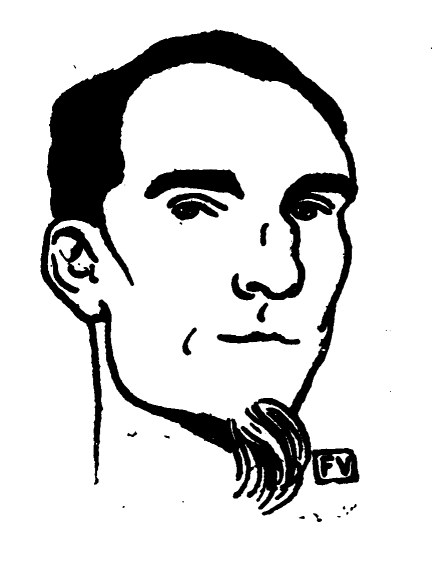
Félix Fénéon by Félix Vallotton (1898)

Fénéon's legal sponsor, Thadée Natanson, offered him a post at La Revue Blanche after the trial and his subsequent expulsion from the War Office; he worked for that magazine until 1903. In that time, he went on to promote the works of Seurat and Signac through the magazine. He organized the first retrospective of Seurat's work in 1900. Seurat is known for a number of works, most significantly A Sunday Afternoon on the Island of La Grande Jatte (French: Un dimanche après-midi à l'Île de la Grande Jatte). Hajo Düchting, the author of Seurat, The Master of Pointillism notes that "Actually he [Fénéon] was the only critic who proved capable of articulating an appreciation of Seurat's picture, and the new method of painting it exemplified, in words notable for their objective tone".

After La Revue Blanche failed, Fénéon went to work for Le Matin, where he anonymously composed daily news "fillers", what the French call "faits-divers" or "sundry events", of three lines each. His authorship was not revealed until the 1940s. In these fillers he captured the complex subtleties of French daily life. The following examples highlight the wit typical of this critic of the mundane:

- A criminal virago, Mlle Tulle, was sentenced by the Rouen court to 10 years hard labor, while her lover got five.
- In a café on Rue Fontaine, Vautour, Lenoir, and Atanis exchanged a few bullets regarding their wives, who were not present.
- "If my candidate loses, I will kill myself," M. Bellavoine, of Fresquienne, Seine-Inferieure, had declared. He killed himself.
- Women suckling their infants argued the workers' cause to the director of the streetcar lines in Toulon. He was unmoved.

After his post at Le Matin, Fénéon directed the Galerie Bernheim-Jeune and became increasingly involved with Neo-Impressionism, especially the art of Georges Seurat. He was the director of the gallery from 1906 to 1925. Before his retirement from the gallery, he is reported to have told a friend that he was "ready for idleness", and then he abruptly quit at the age of 63.

== Works ==
- Les Impressionnistes en 1886
- Œuvres; preface by Jean Paulhan, Paris, Gallimard, 1948
- Œuvres plus que complètes, 1970
- Novels in Three Lines (French: Nouvelles en trois lignes), translated and with an introduction by Lucy Sante, 2007
- Correspondance de Fanny & Félix Fénéon avec Maximilien Luce, 2001
- Petit supplément aux œuvres plus que complètes, 2 volumes
- Le Procès des Trente, 2004
- Correspondance de Stéphane Mallarmé et Félix Fénéon, Maurice Imbert, editor, 2007
