= The Port of Marseille =

Painting by Paul Signac

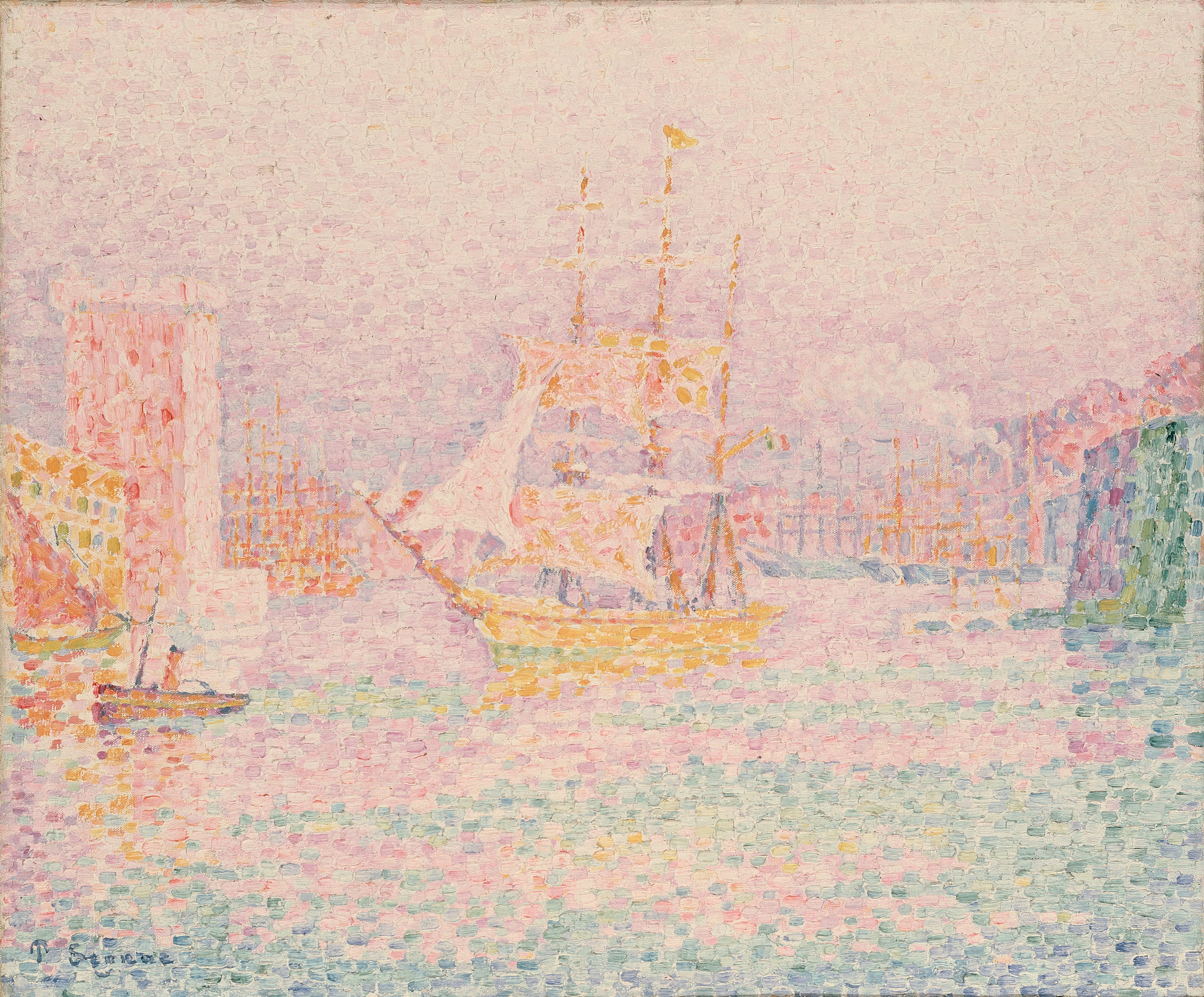
- Artist: Paul Signac
- Year: 1907
- Medium: Oil on canvas
- Dimensions: 46 cm × 55 cm (18 in × 22 in)
- Location: Hermitage Museum; Saint Petersburg

The Port of Marseille is a 1907 oil on canvas Pointillist painting by Paul Signac, now in the Hermitage Museum, St Petersburg, Russia. The city's ships and port were a favourite subject of the painter, who also produced The Port of Marseille (1884), A View of Marseille (1905) and The Port of Marseille (1931).

== See also ==
- List of paintings by Paul Signac
