= Le Sentier des Douanes =

Painting by Paul Signac

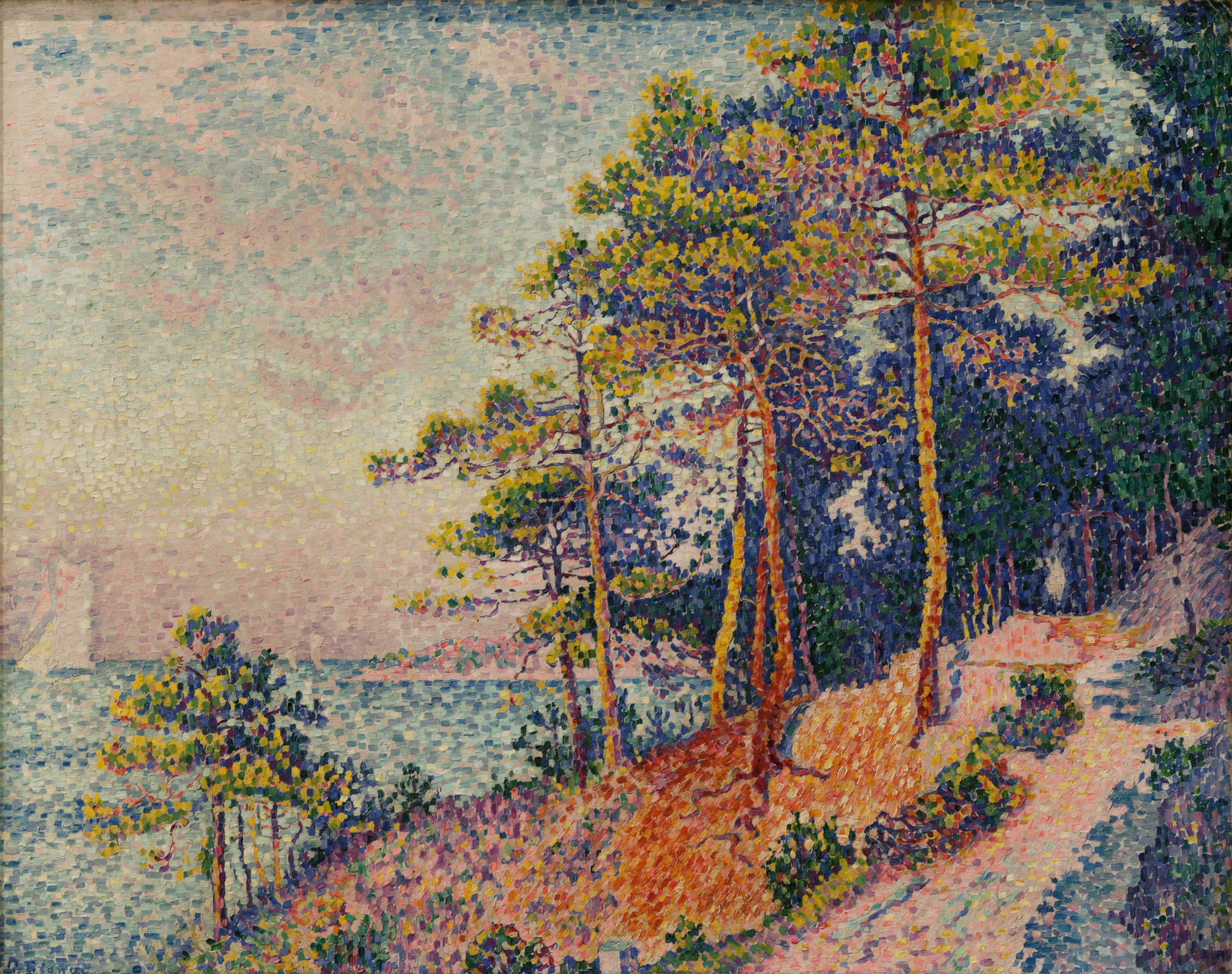
- Artist: Paul Signac
- Year: 1905
- Medium: Oil on canvas
- Dimensions: 72 cm × 92.5 cm (28 in × 36.4 in)
- Location: Musée de Grenoble

Le Sentier des douanes is a Pointillist-divisionist oil on canvas painting by Paul Signac, measuring 72 by 92.5 cm. It shows the 'Sentier des Douanes', a seaside path in Saint-Tropez. The work now hangs in the musée de Grenoble, to which it was left in 1923 by Georgette Agutte and Marcel Sembat.

Signac produced several crayon, ink and watercolour preparatory sketches, before producing an initial version of the painting in 1902. In summer 1904 he travelled to Saint-Tropez, where he worked with Matisse. He produced the final work in his studio in 1905, the year Fauvism was born. For a time it was known as Saint-Tropez or Le sentier côtier, but he settled on Le Sentier des douanes as its final title in 1905.

It demonstrates the artist's identification with the Pointillist movement in his choice to use different brushstrokes to show different falls of light – oblique ones for the slopes of the hill, vertical ones for the trees and horizontal ones for the sky and sea – altogether allowing him to give a dynamic effect to all the spaces shown.

Captivated by the light and colours of a sunset, he contrasted the blue-violet tones of the sea and shadows with pink-oranges of the earth and the tree trunks. The work also highlights his attempts to show the quay as faithfully as possible by using preparatory drawings and sketches.

== See also ==
- List of paintings by Paul Signac
