= The Lagoon of Saint Mark, Venice =

Painting by Paul Signac

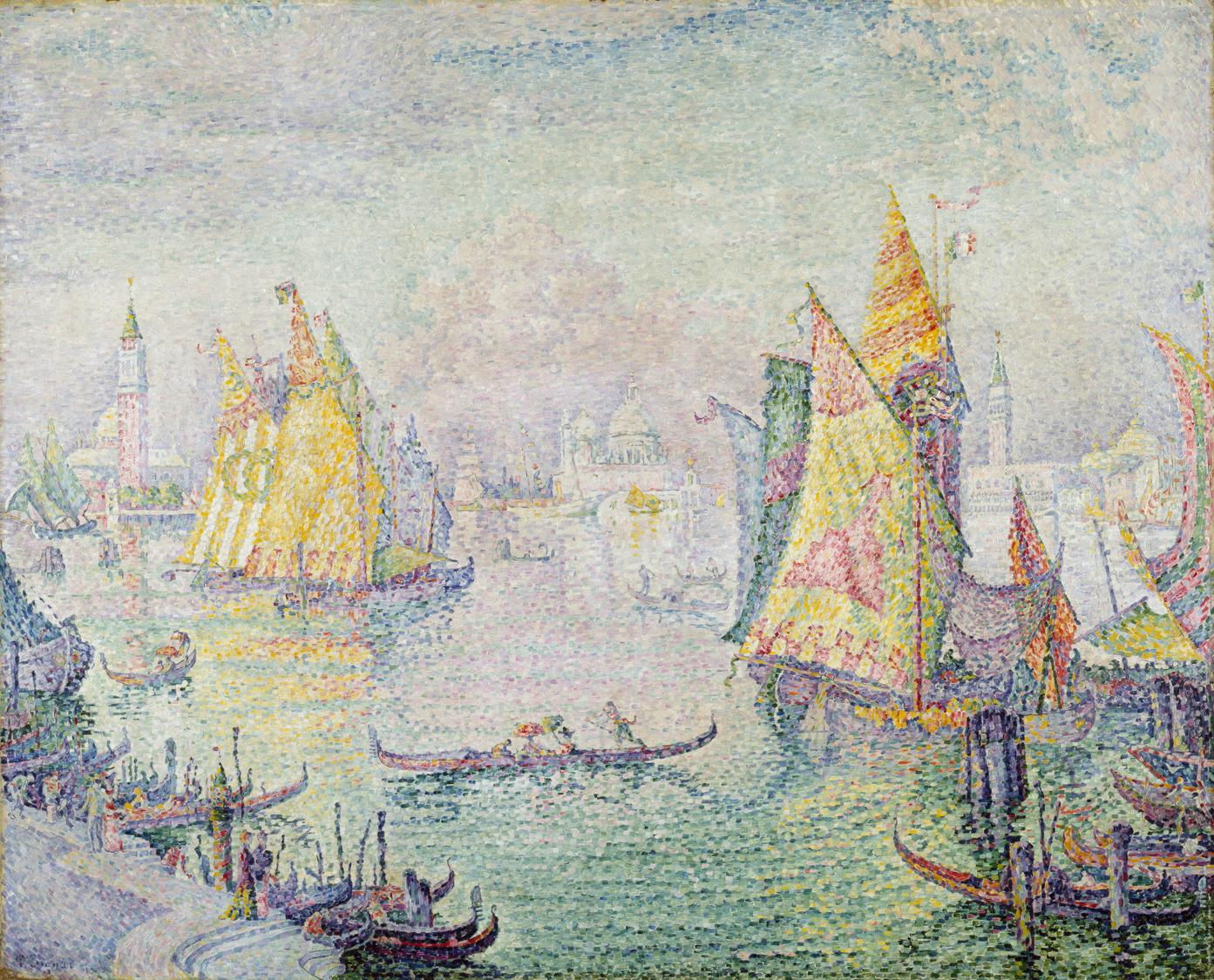
- Artist: Paul Signac
- Year: 1905
- Medium: Oil on canvas
- Dimensions: 129.5 cm × 162.6 cm (51.0 in × 64.0 in)
- Location: Chrysler Museum of Art; Norfolk VA

The Lagoon of Saint Mark, Venice is an oil on canvas painting by Paul Signac. This painting focuses on a seascape image which became a common theme late in Signac's life.

Paul Signac (1863–1935) was one of the most influential Neo-Impressionist painters of his time. His name is synonymous with that of Georges Seurat (1859–91) as well as the practice of Color Theory. One of his lesser-known paintings, The Lagoon of Saint Mark, Venice, (1905) is a prime example of his technique of pointillism and experimentation with color theory.

== Description ==
The painting depicts an afternoon on a lagoon in Venice, and is a testament to Signac's skill with seascape imagery. The work is constructed with brilliant hues of blues and greens juxtaposing one another. When standing close to the painting, the only discernible features are the brush strokes; this technique of painting was labeled, Pointillism, by Seurat. Artists using this technique along with Seurat became known as Neo-Impressionists.

The Lagoon of Saint Mark, Venice, is in the background, gondolas in the middle ground, and docks can be seen in the foreground. The sky is awash with pastel purple and blue and large clouds appear throughout the top half of the canvas. The bottom half of the canvas depicts a series of steps leading down to the docks where gondolas are haphazardly tied to posts in the water. The water slowly ebbs in from the wake of the slow-moving gondola in the middle of the painting. The mirroring effect that the steps and water have on one another makes the painting come alive as this movement extends out of the canvas towards the viewer.

== Signac and Seurat ==
Signac came into contact with this technique through Seurat as the two became good friends. Signac met Seurat in 1884 at a meeting of the Société des Artistes Indépendants. The two exhibited their work together at the first Salon des Indépendants. Seurat was Signac's primary source of influence and the two were able to come up with a similar the process of color division on a canvas. Eugene Chevreul was a scientist who put forth the theory that colors appear most intensely when placed next to their complements, coining this theory the "law of simultaneous contrast". Signac and Seurat took this theory and created paintings that explored the scientific reasoning behind color.

Signac stayed true to this technique throughout his career from his meeting Seurat until his death in 1935. He published treatises on the topic of color such as D'Eugène Delacroix au Neo-Impressionnisme, in 1898. Signac was active in the Neo-Impressionist world becoming president of the Société des Artistes Indépendants in 1908 and remaining in office until his death. His more famous paintings depict seascapes such as Antibes, The Pink Cloud (1916). The Lagoon of St. Mark is an early example of his seascapes that clearly demonstrates the process of color division and the law of simultaneous contrast.

Hanging in the Impressionist gallery, in the Chrysler Museum of Art, Signac's 1905 painting is surrounded by the likes of Claude Monet, Edgar Degas, and Pierre Renoir. The room is awash with color and movement and amidst it all, The Lagoon is displayed predominantly on the back wall. Next to it hangs Henri-Edmond Cross's Excursion complementing Signac's painting. The two works utilize the pointillist technique although they sport notable differences. Cross was a contemporary of Signac's and the two met at the founding of the Société des Artistes Indépendants in 1884; Cross however didn't practice the theory of Divisionism until 1891. Comparing Signac's painting with Cross's, both clearly utilize the pointillist technique to the fullest, however The Lagoon is much less delineated in terms of appearance. With The Lagoon, viewers are required to step away from the painting in order to take in the whole image; whereas with Excursion, the entirety of the image can be seen closer to the canvas.

Signac's life was devoted to finding harmony with colour, writing, "It is through the harmonies of lines and of colors...not through the subject that the painter ought to stir the emotions."

== See also ==
- List of paintings by Paul Signac
