= Entrance to the Grand Canal, Venice (Signac) =

Painting by Paul Signac

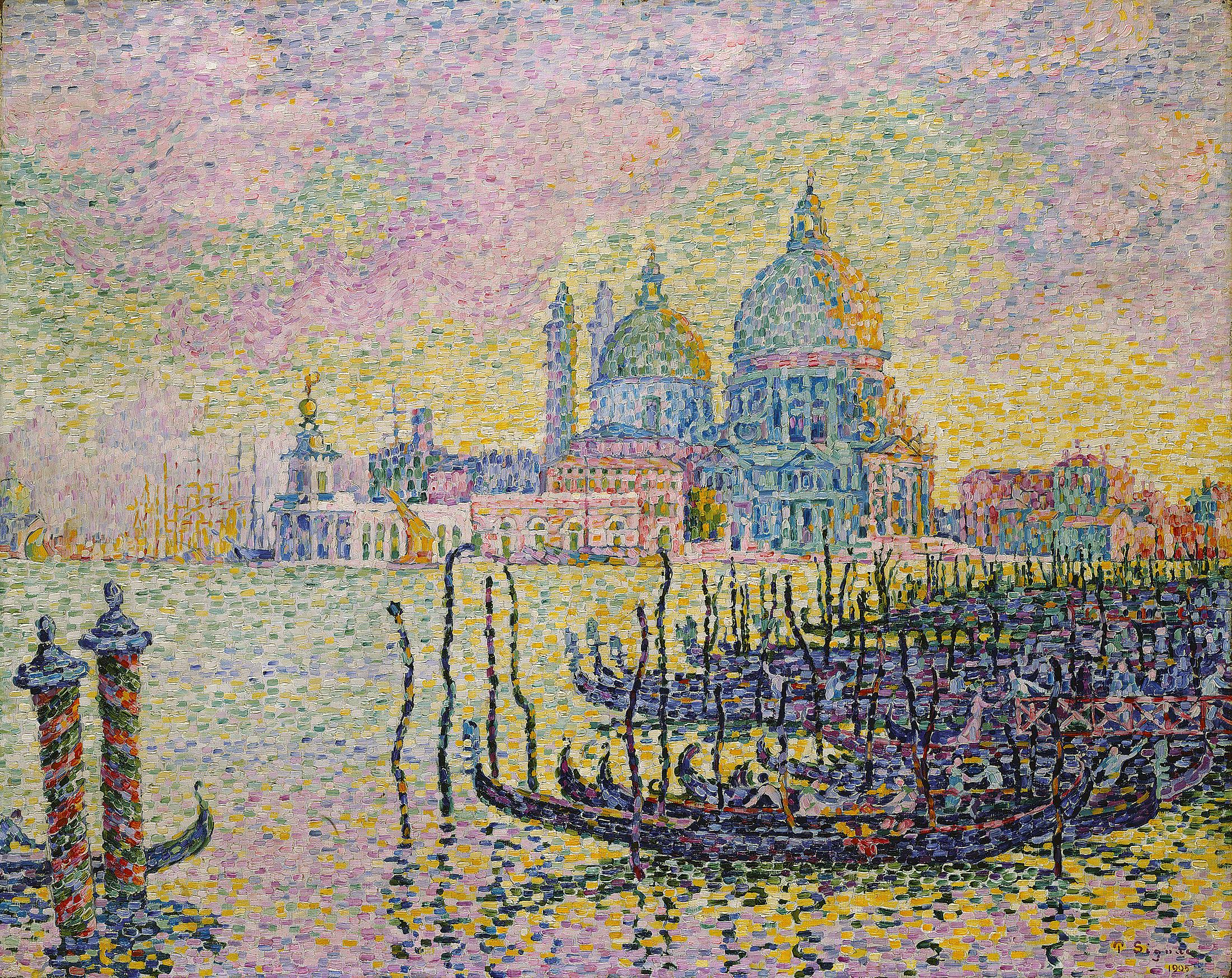
- Artist: Paul Signac
- Year: 1905
- Medium: Oil on canvas
- Dimensions: 73.5 cm × 92.1 cm (28.9 in × 36.3 in)
- Location: Toledo Museum of Art; Toledo

Entrance to the Grand Canal, Venice is an oil on canvas painting by Paul Signac, painted in 1905, now in the Toledo Museum of Art, Ohio, USA. It shows the entrance to the Grand Canal in Venice, with the Dogana da Mar and Santa Maria della Salute in the background.

== See also ==
- List of paintings by Paul Signac
