= Françoise Cachin =

French art historian (1936–2011)

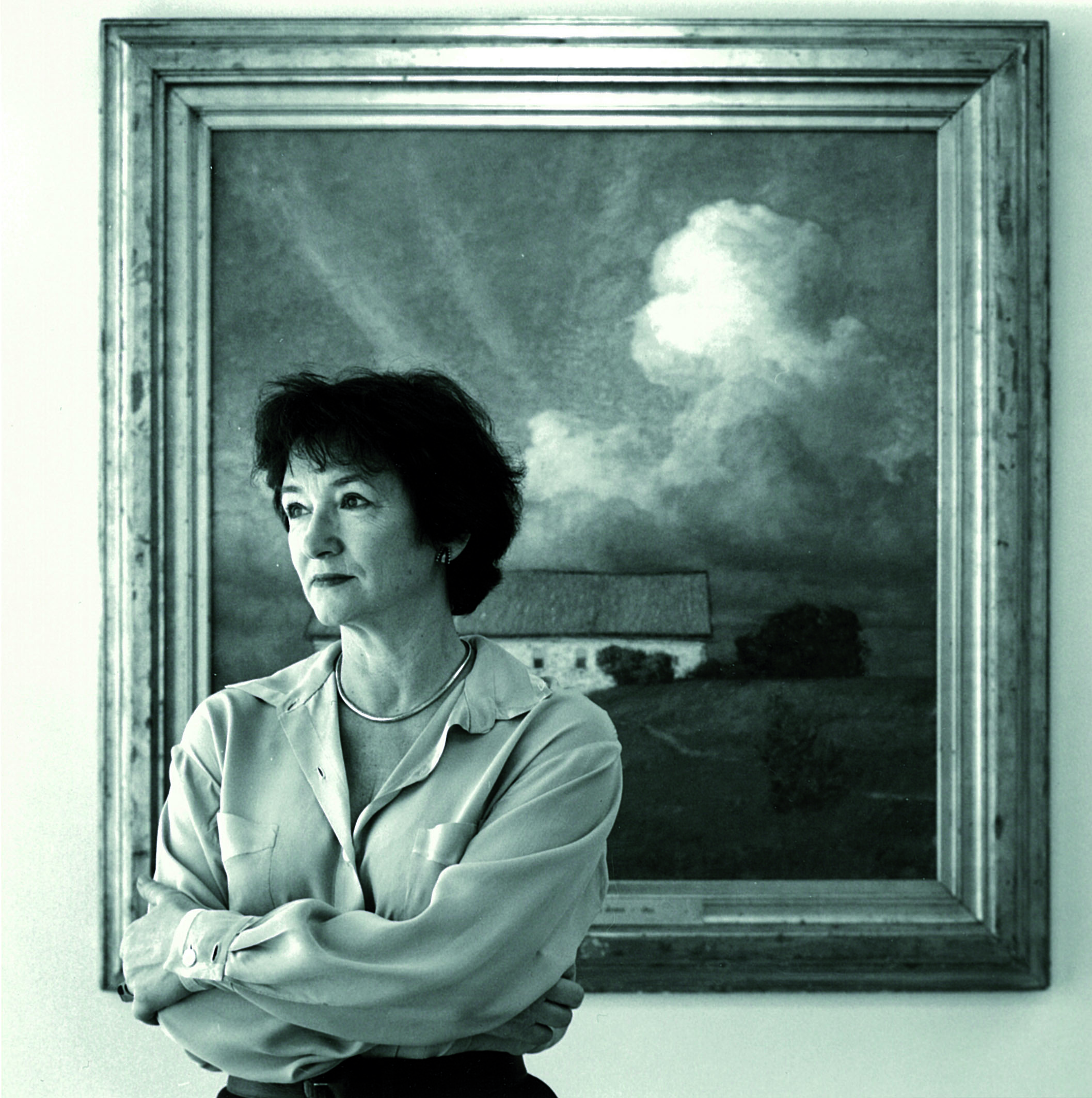
- Françoise Cachin in 1996
- Born: 8 May 1936; Paris, France
- Died: 4 February 2011 (aged 74); Paris, France
- Occupation: Art historian

Françoise Cachin (8 May 1936, Paris – 4 February 2011, Paris) was a French art historian and curator. She was the founding director of the Musée d’Orsay and the author of numerous books on 19th-century French painting.

== Life ==
Françoise Cachin was born to the pediatrician Charles Cachin and his wife Ginette (née Signac). Her grandparents included the communist politician Marcel Cachin and the pointillist painters Paul Signac and Jeanne Selmersheim-Desgrange.

Cachin studied art history under André Chastel at the Institut d'Art et d'Archéologie of the University of Paris. After training at the Louvre and the Galerie nationale du Jeu de Paume, she worked as a curator at the Musée National d'Art Moderne from 1969 to 1978, eventually becoming chief curator. In this capacity she organized numerous exhibitions, including an important Paul Klee retrospective, and oversaw the museum's move from the Palais de Tokyo to the new Centre Georges Pompidou.

In 1978 Cachin joined the planning team for the new Musée d'Orsay. During this time she continued to organize exhibitions, including a major Manet retrospective in 1983. When the Musée d'Orsay opened in 1986 she was named director, and in this role organized retrospectives of Paul Gauguin (1989) and Georges Seurat (1991).

In 1994 Cachin left the head of the Musée d'Orsay and assumed the post of Director of French Museums, which carried the responsibility for over 1,000 museums across France. Despite this, she still found time to compile a catalogue raisonné of works by her grandfather Paul Signac, which was published in 2000.

Cachin retired from her directorial position in 2001 but remained active in the museum world. She helped found the French Regional & American Museums Exchange (FRAME), and (unsuccessfully) lead opposition to the Louvre's plan to construct the Louvre Abu Dhabi. In 2009 she was named a Grand Officier of the Ordre national du Mérite.

Cachin died on 4 February 2011 of amyloidosis, aged 74. She was at work editing the journals of Paul Signac.

== Selected works ==
- Cachin, Françoise; Moffett, Charles S.; Wilson-Bareau, Juliet (1983). Manet, 1832 – 1883: Galeries Nationales du Grand Palais, Paris April 22 – August 8, 1983; The Metropolitan Museum of Art, New York September 10 – November 27, 1983. New York: The Metropolitan Museum of Art. ISBN 978-0870993497.
- Gauguin : « Ce malgré moi de sauvage », collection « Découvertes Gallimard » (nº 49), série Arts. Éditions Gallimard, 1989, new edition in 2017
  - UK edition – Gauguin: The Quest for Paradise, 'New Horizons' series. Thames & Hudson, 1992
  - US edition – Gauguin: The Quest for Paradise, "Abrams Discoveries" series. Harry N. Abrams, 1992
- Seurat : Le rêve de l'art-science, collection « Découvertes Gallimard » (nº 108), série Arts. Éditions Gallimard, 1991
- Manet : « J'ai fait ce que j'ai vu », collection « Découvertes Gallimard » (nº 203), série Arts. Éditions Gallimard, 1994, new edition in 2011
  - UK edition – Manet: Painter of Modern Life, 'New Horizons' series. Thames & Hudson, 1995
  - US edition – Manet: The Influence of the Modern, "Abrams Discoveries" series. Harry N. Abrams, 1995
