= The Pine Tree at Saint Tropez =

Painting by Paul Signac

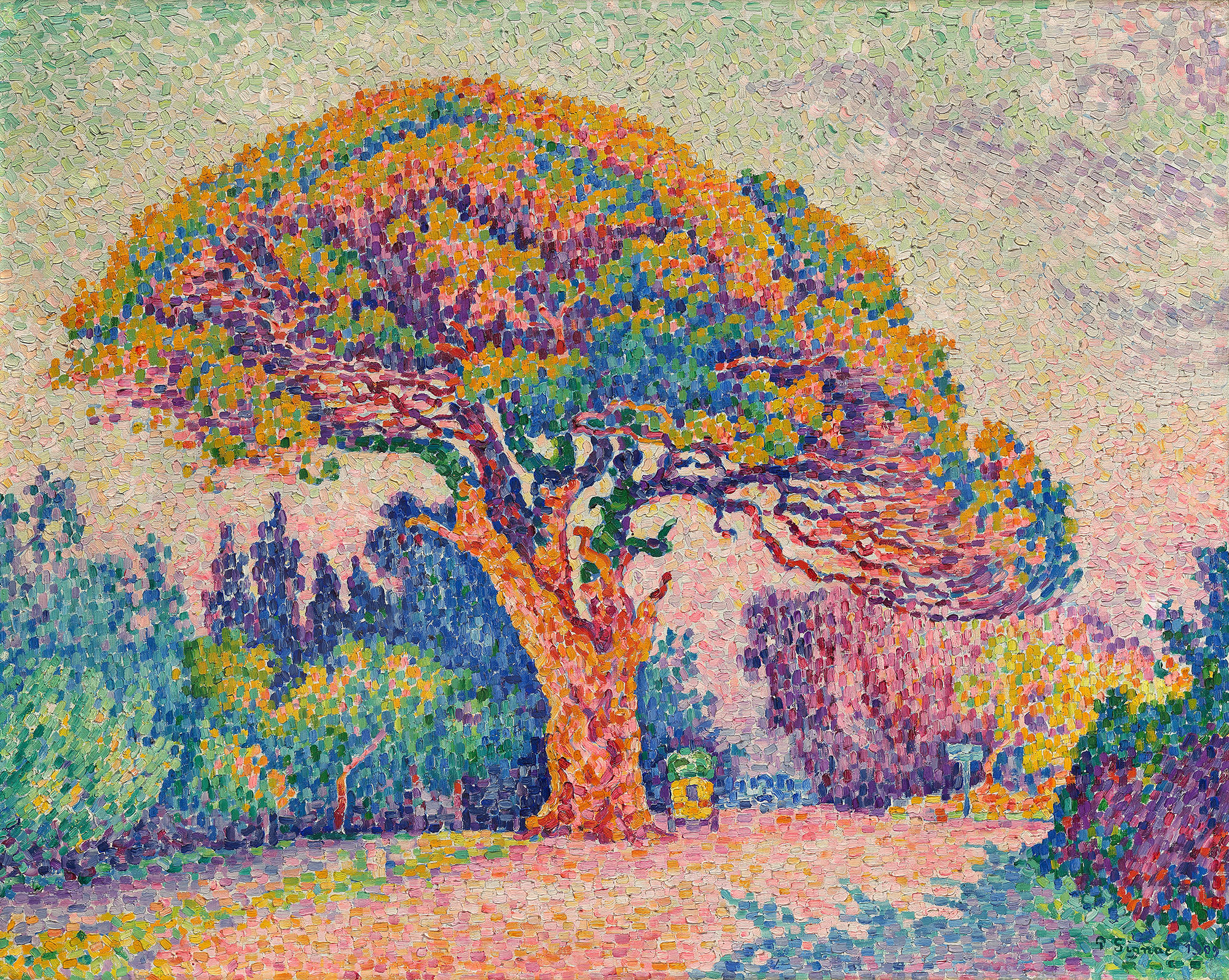
- Artist: Paul Signac
- Year: 1909
- Medium: Oil on canvas
- Location: Pushkin Museum, Moscow

The Pine Tree at Saint Tropez, Bertaud's Pine or Bertaud Gassin's Pine (French - Le Pin de Bertaud Gassin) is an oil-on-canvas painting by French painter Paul Signac, from 1909. A landscape painting in Divisionist style, it has been in the Pushkin Museum in Moscow since 1948. It was owned by S. I. Shchukin until 1918 before being seized by the Soviet state after the October Revolution and assigned to the State Museum of Modern Western Art.
