= Paul Signac =

French painter (1863–1935)

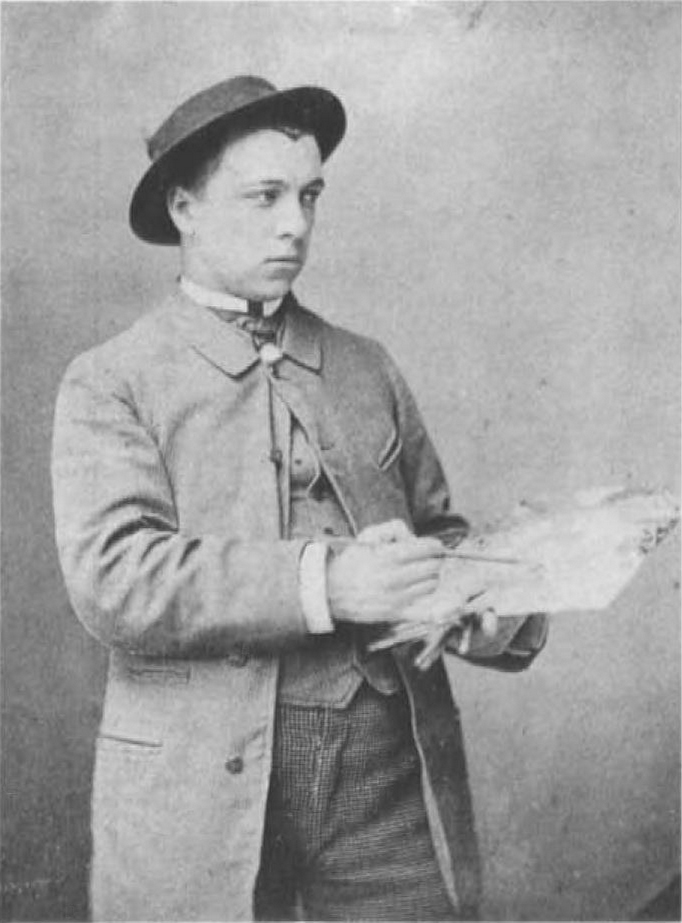
- Signac with his palette, c. 1883
- Born: Paul Victor Jules Signac; 11 November 1863; Paris, France
- Died: 15 August 1935 (aged 71); Paris, France
- Known for: Painting
- Notable work: List of paintings
- Movement: Post-Impressionism, Pointillism, Divisionism, Neo-impressionism

Paul Victor Jules Signac (/siːnˈjɑːk/ seen-YAHK, French: [pɔl siɲak]; 11 November 1863 – 15 August 1935) was a French Neo-Impressionist painter who, with Georges Seurat, helped develop the artistic technique Pointillism.

A keen sailor, he is best known for his seascapes and views of ports and rivers.

== Biography ==
Paul-Victor-Jules Signac was born in Paris on 11 November 1863. His parents wanted him to study architecture but, as he said, his preference was to draw the Seine. He was particularly affected by an 1880 exhibition of Claude Monet's work. Signac began boating.

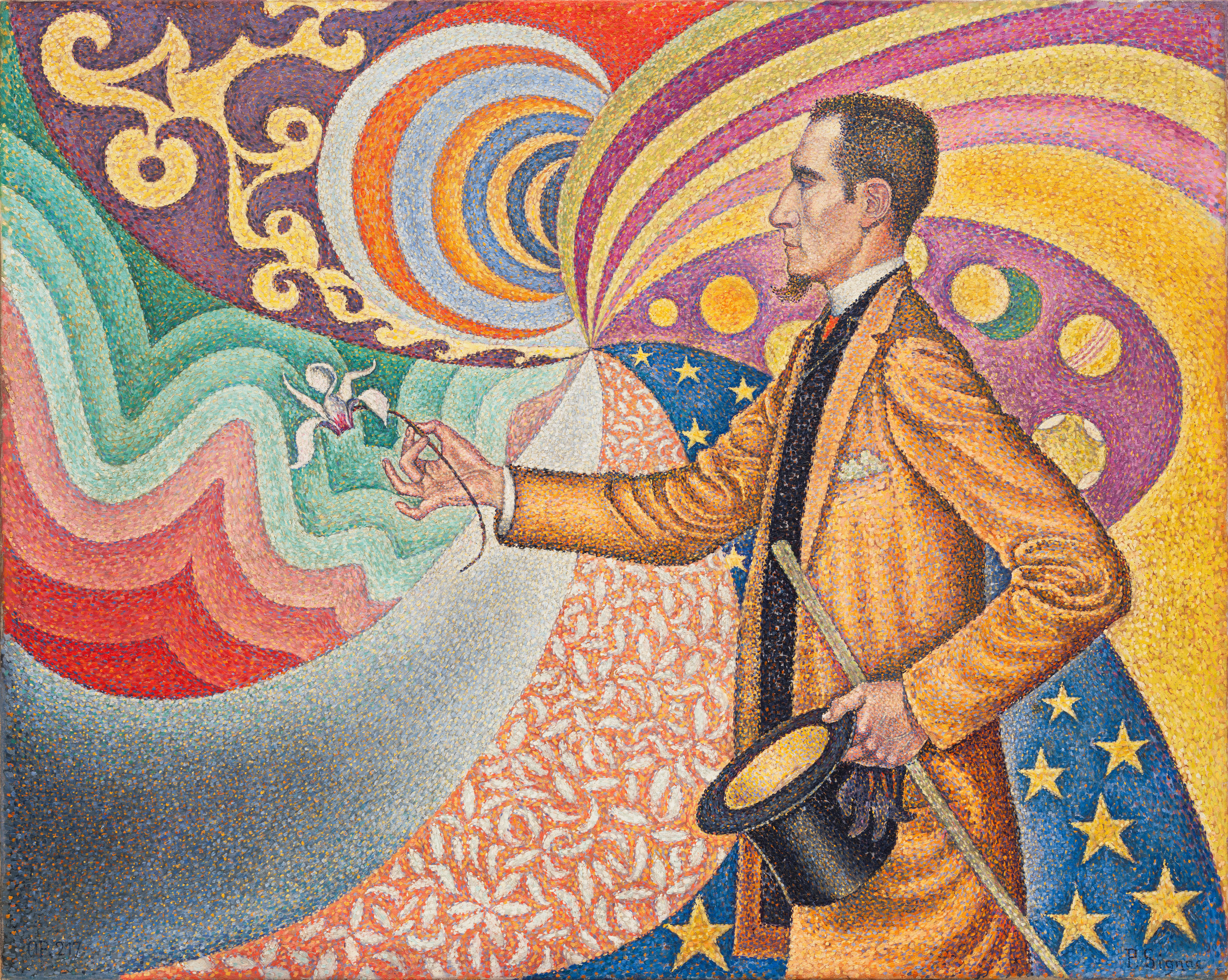
Portrait of Félix Fénéon, by Paul Signac in 1890, oil on canvas, 73.5 × 92.5 cm (28.9 × 36.4 in), Museum of Modern Art, New York

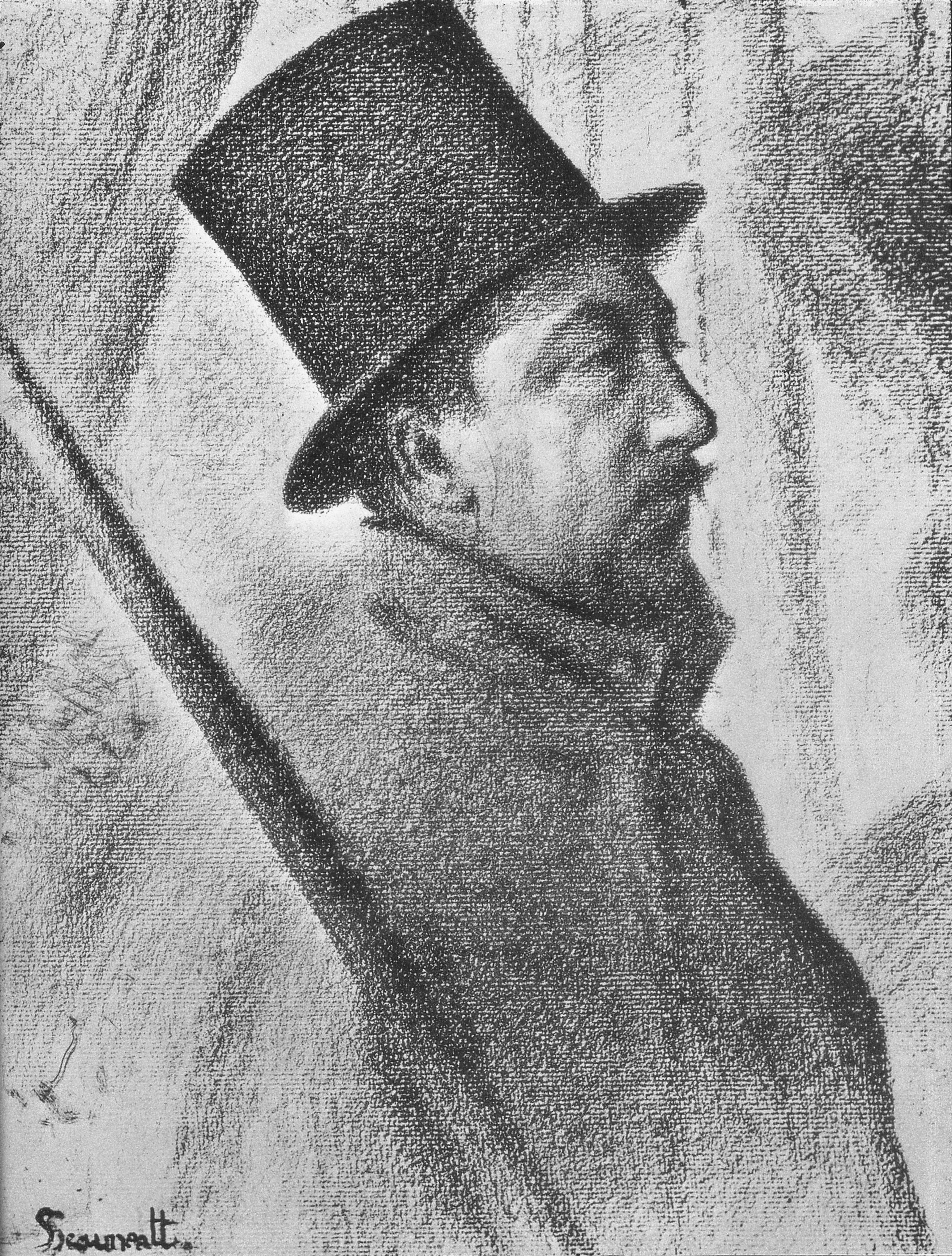
Portrait of Paul Signac by Georges Seurat in 1890, conté crayon, private collection

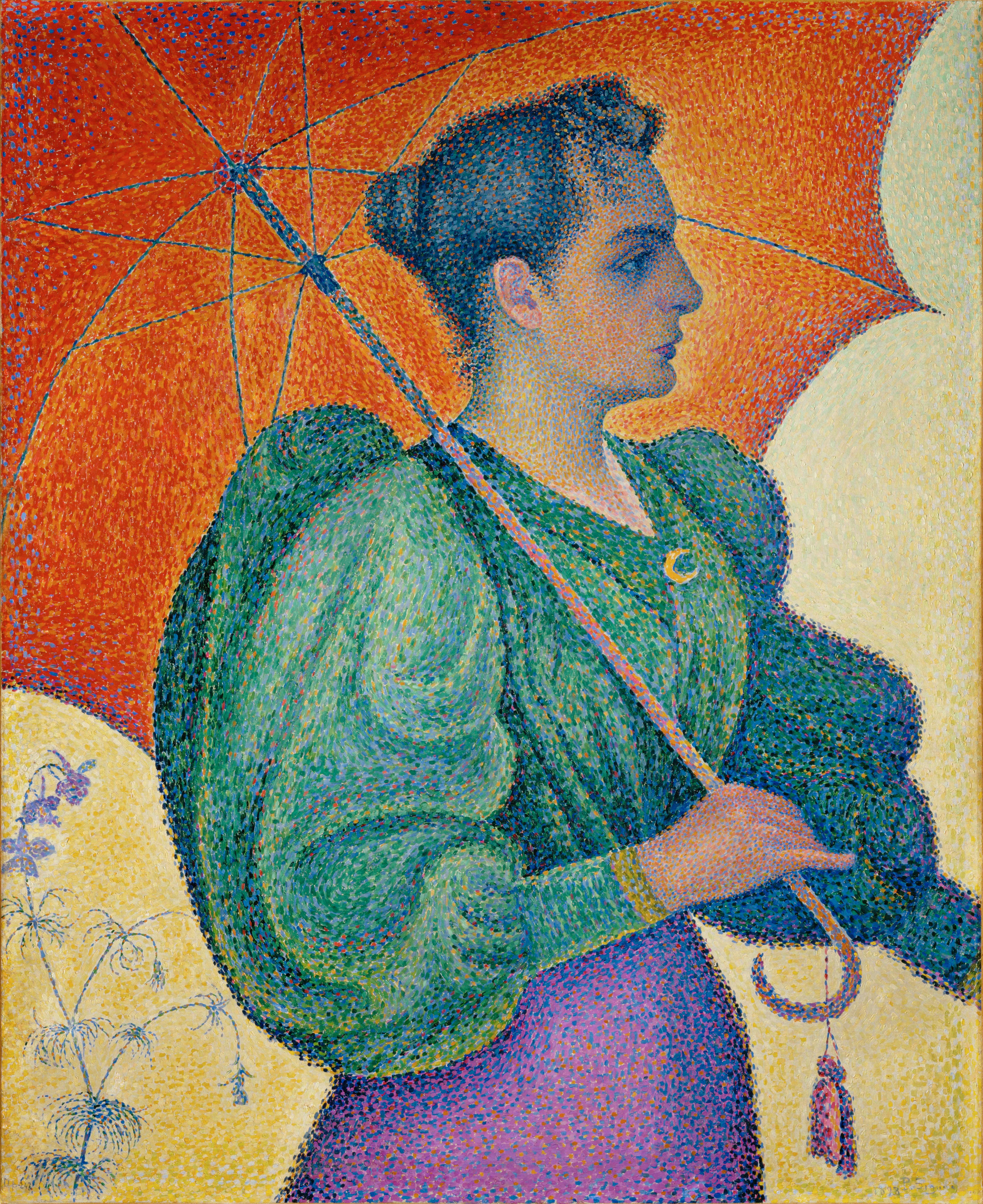
Portrait of his wife, Berthe, painted at Saint-Tropez by Paul Signac, 1893, Femme à l'ombrelle (Woman with Umbrella), oil on canvas, 81 x 65 cm, Musée d'Orsay, Paris

In 1884 he met Claude Monet and Georges Seurat. He was struck by the systematic working methods of Seurat and by his theory of colors and he became Seurat's faithful supporter, friend, and heir with his description of Neo-Impressionism and Divisionism method. Under Seurat's influence he abandoned the short brushstrokes of Impressionism to experiment with scientifically-juxtaposed small dots of pure color, intended to combine and blend not on the canvas, but in the viewer's eye, the defining feature of Pointillism.

The Mediterranean coast is a major theme across Signac's paintings. He left the capital each summer, to stay in the south of France in the village of Collioure or at St. Tropez, where he bought a house and invited his friends. He envisioned the south of France as the perfect location for a future anarchist utopia.

Signac, Albert Dubois-Pillet, Odilon Redon, and Seurat were among the founders of the Société des Artistes Indépendants. The association began in Paris 29 July 1884 with the organization of massive exhibitions, embracing as their motto, "Neither jury nor awards" (Sans jury ni récompense). "The purpose of Société des Artistes Indépendants—based on the principle of abolishing admission jury—is to allow the artists to present their works to public judgement with complete freedom". For the following three decades their annual exhibitions flourished and set the trends in art of the early twentieth century. Signac was a guiding force in the Société and was its President from 1908 until his death.

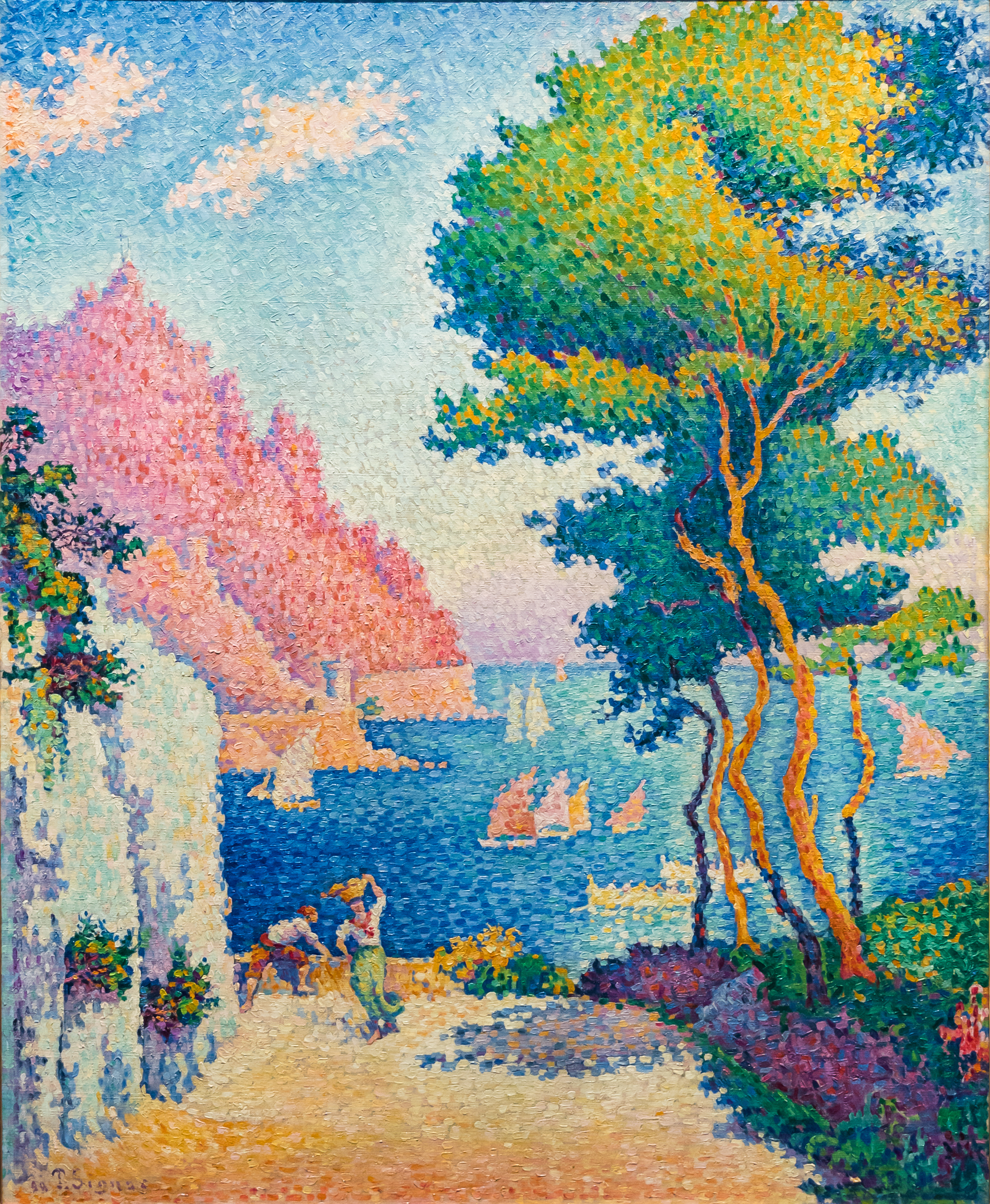
Capo di Noli, 1898, oil on canvas, 93.5 × 75 cm (36.8 × 29.5 in), Wallraf-Richartz Museum, Cologne

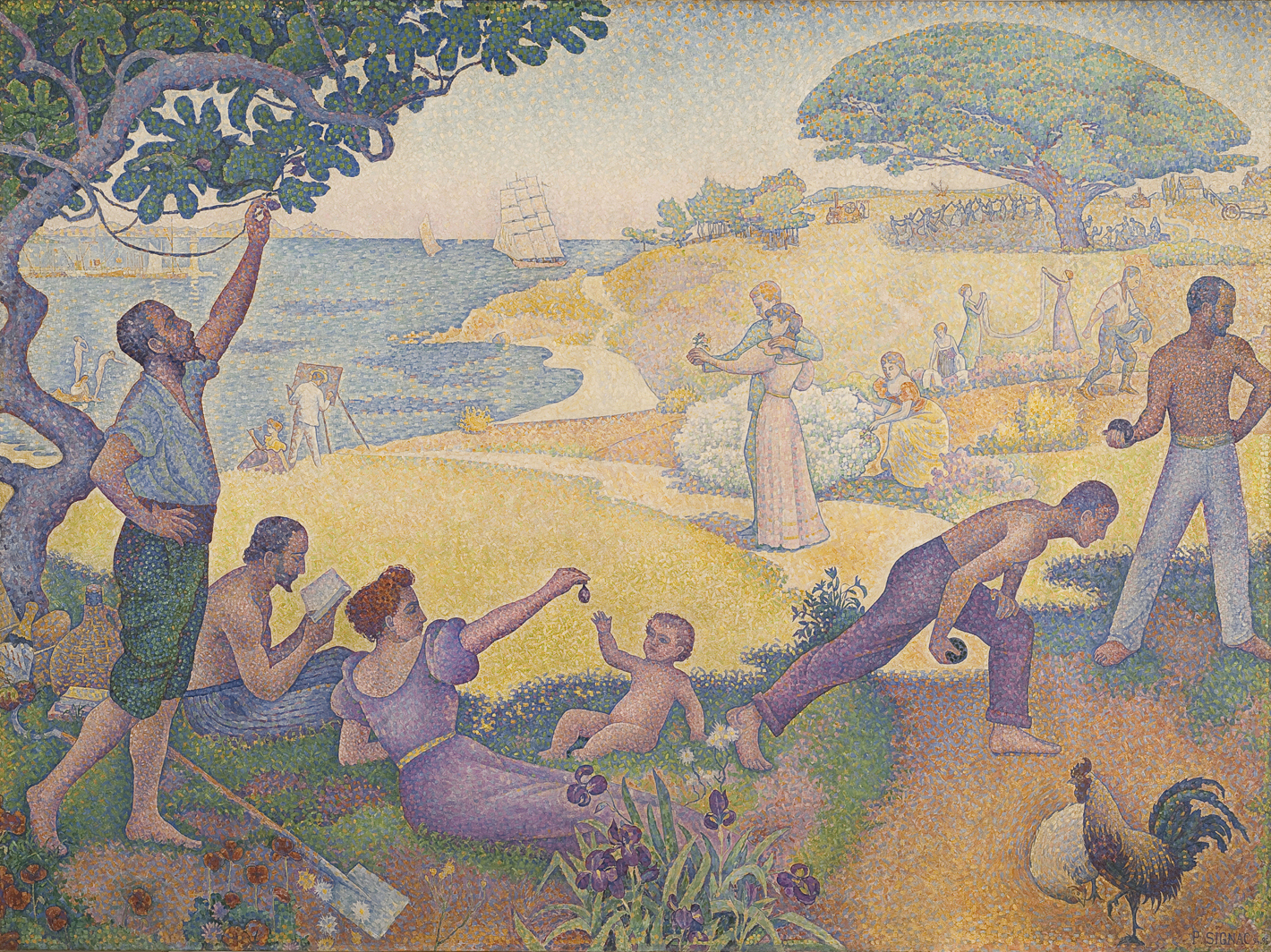
In the Time of Harmony: the Golden Age is not in the Past, it is in the Future, 1893–95, oil on canvas, 310 x 410 cm (122 × 161.4 in), Mairie de Montreuil, Paris

In 1886 Signac met Vincent van Gogh in Paris. During 1887 the two artists regularly went to Asnières-sur-Seine together, where they painted such subjects as river landscapes and cafés. Initially, Van Gogh chiefly admired Signac's loose painting technique. Signac also met Toulouse Lautrec, who was a friend of Van Gogh.

In March 1889, Signac visited Van Gogh at Arles. In 1890, during the banquet of the XX exhibition in Brussels, Lautrec challenged to a duel the artist Henri de Groux who criticized Van Gogh's works. Signac declared he would continue to fight for Van Gogh’s honor if Lautrec was killed. De Groux apologized for the slight and left the group and the duel never took place.

The next year he made a short trip to Italy, seeing Genoa, Florence, and Naples.

In 1888, Signac discovered anarchist ideas by reading Élisée Reclus, Kropotkin, and Jean Grave, who all developed the ideas of anarchist communism. With his friends Charles Angrand, Henri-Edmond Cross, Maximilien Luce, and Camille Pissarro he contributed to Jean Grave's paper, Les Temps Nouveaux (New Times).

In 1892, he sailed the Garonne River southeast in France to the Mediterranean Sea, spending time in Saint-Tropez.

Signac experimented with various media. As well as oil paintings and watercolors he made etchings, lithographs, and many pen-and-ink sketches composed of small, laborious dots.

The Neo-Impressionists influenced the next generation: Signac inspired Henri Matisse, André Derain and his friend Robert Deborne in particular, thus playing a decisive role in the evolution of Fauvism. Signac himself did not admire the style when it first appeared.

Having prospered well, his financial support of the arts was considerable. As donations, he sent regular cheques and made a gift of his works for five lotteries between 1895 and 1912. Signac's 1893 painting, In the Time of Harmony originally was entitled, In the Time of Anarchy, but political repression targeting the anarchists in France at this time forced him to change the title before the work could be accepted by a gallery.

At the 1905 Salon des Indépendants, Henri Matisse exhibited the proto-Fauve painting Luxe, Calme et Volupté. The brightly colored composition was painted in 1904 after a summer spent working in St. Tropez on the French Riviera alongside the neo-Impressionist painters Henri-Edmond Cross and Paul Signac. The painting is Matisse's most important work in which he used the Divisionist technique advocated by Signac, which Matisse had adopted in 1898 after reading Signac's essay, d'Eugène Delacroix au Néo-Impressionnisme. Signac purchased the work after the 1905 Salon des Indépendants. In 1908 Signac was elected president of the Twenty-fourth Salon des Indépendants.

As president of the Société des Artistes Indépendants, from 1908 until his death, Signac encouraged younger artists by exhibiting the controversial works of the Fauves and the Cubists. He was the first patron to buy a painting by Matisse.

Signac served as a juror with Florence Meyer Blumenthal in awarding the Prix Blumenthal, a grant given between 1919 and 1954 to painters, sculptors, decorators, engravers, writers, and musicians.

== Personal life ==
Portrait of Paul Signac on a boat by Théo van Rysselberghe

On 7 November 1892, Signac married Berthe Roblès at the town hall of the 18th arrondissement of Paris. The witnesses at the wedding were Alexandre Lemonier, Maximilien Luce, Camille Pissarro, and Georges Lecomte.

In November 1897, the Signacs moved to a new apartment in the Castel Béranger, which was built by Hector Guimard. A little later, in December of the same year, they acquired a house in Saint-Tropez named La Hune where the painter had a vast studio constructed that he inaugurated on 16 August 1898.

In September 1913, Signac rented a house at Antibes, where he took up residence with Jeanne Selmersheim-Desgrange. She gave birth to their daughter, Ginette, on 2 October 1913. Meanwhile, Signac left La Hune and the Castel Beranger apartment to Berthe and they remained friends for the rest of his life. On 6 April 1927, Signac formally adopted Ginette. His granddaughter, Françoise Cachin, was an art historian.

Paul Signac died from sepsis in Paris on 15 August 1935 at the age of 71. His body was cremated and was interred three days later, on 18 August, at the Père Lachaise Cemetery.

== Author ==
Signac wrote several important works on the theory of art, among them, From Eugène Delacroix to Neo-Impressionism, first published in serial form in 1898. It is an important history of color and explanation of neo-impressionist technique. It also discusses Johan Barthold Jongkind (1819–1891). Signac also authored several introductions to the catalogues of art exhibitions and many other writings yet to be published.

Politically, he was an anarchist, as were many of his friends, including Félix Fénéon, Maximilien Luce and Camille Pissarro.

== Gallery ==
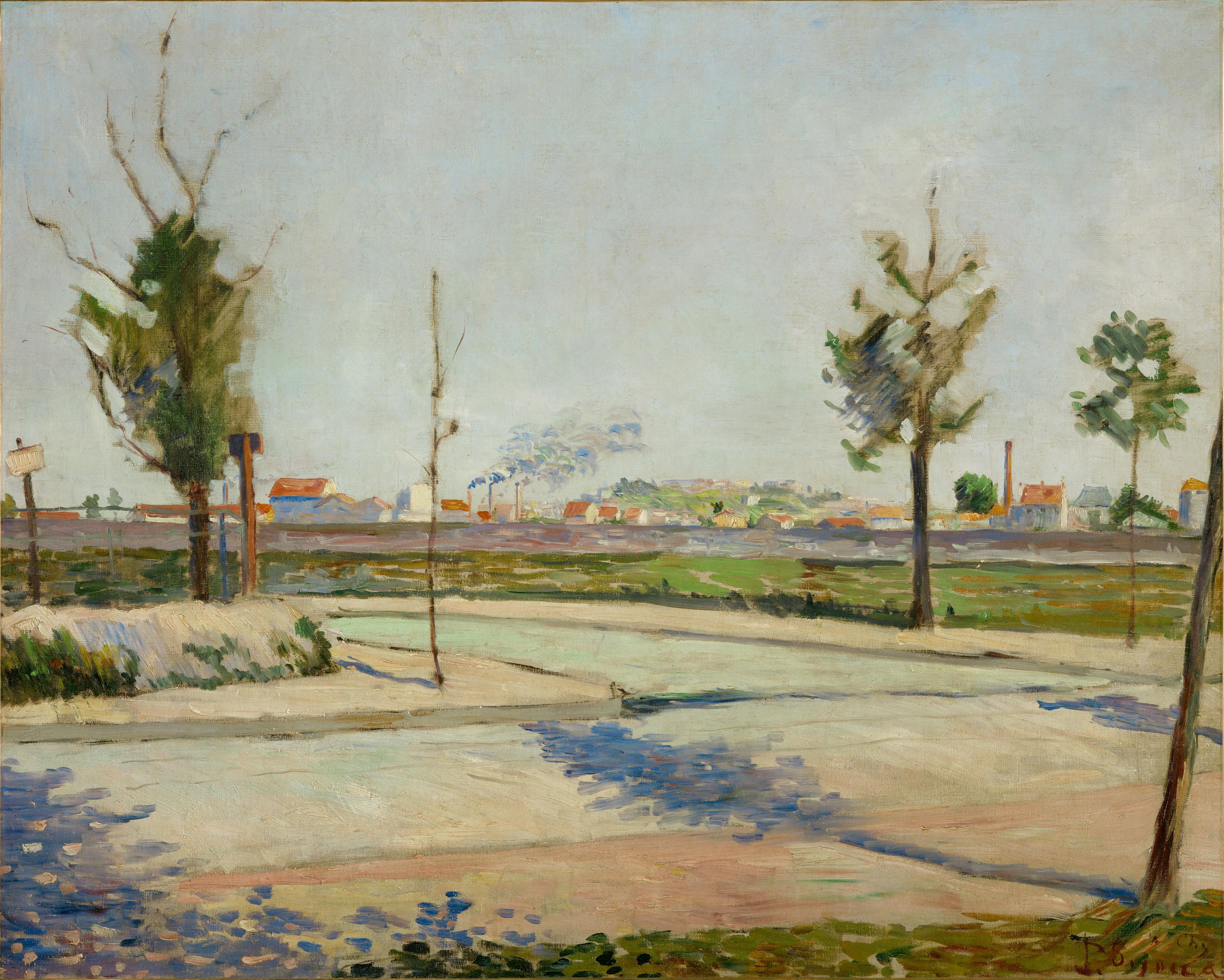
Road to Gennevilliers, 1883, Musée d'Orsay, Paris

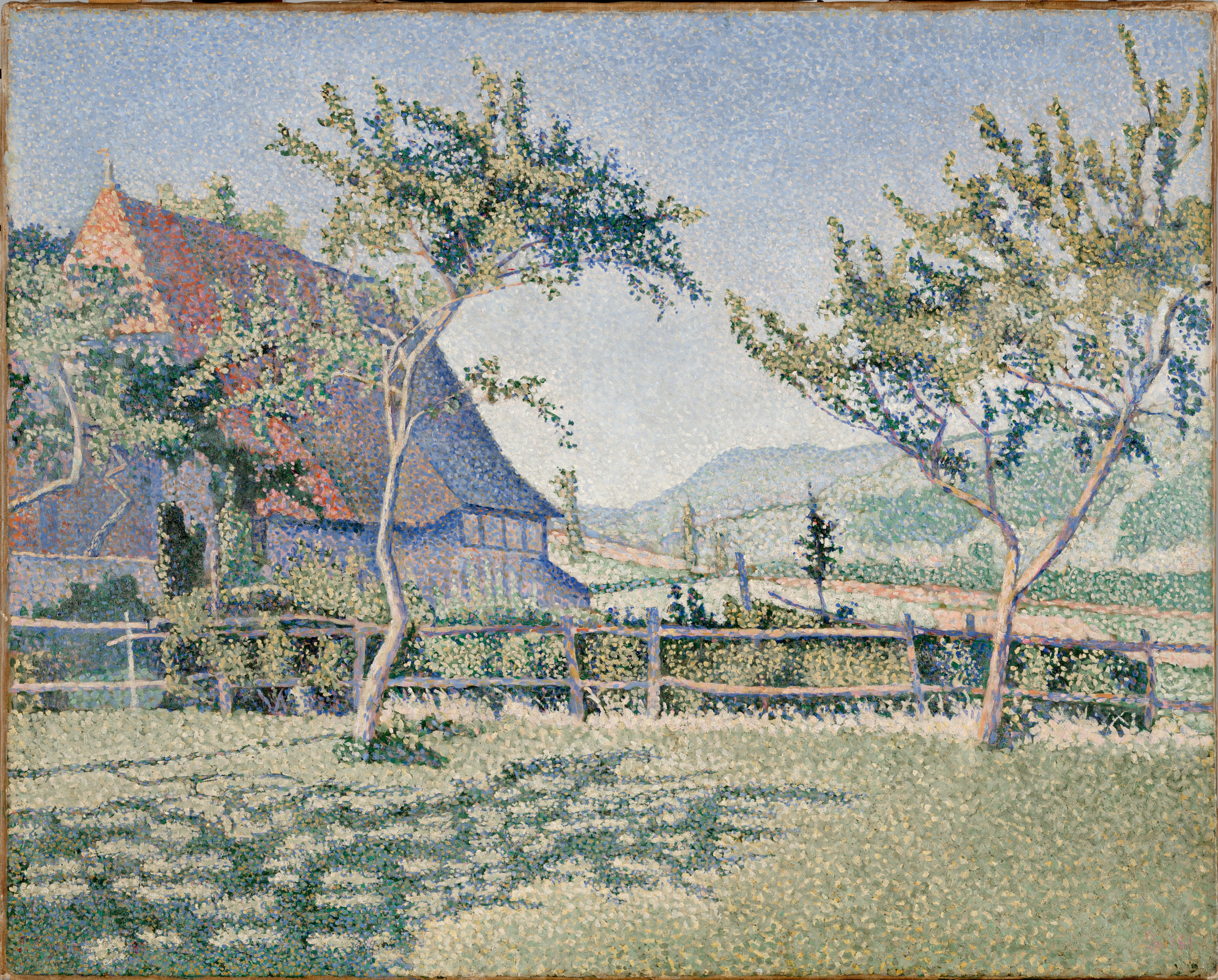
Comblat le Chateau. Le Pré., 1886, Dallas Museum of Art

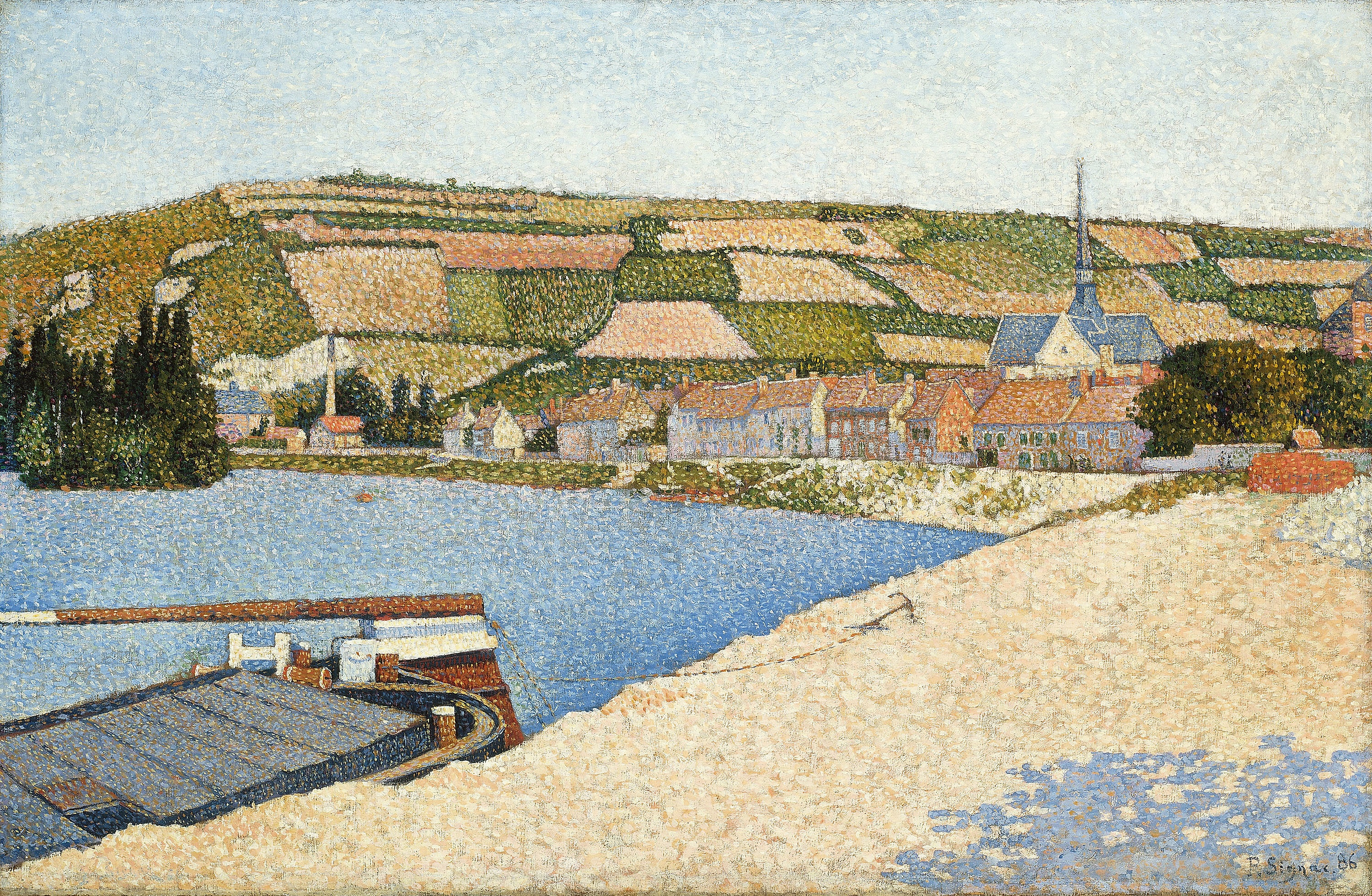
Les Andelys, Côte d'Aval, 1886, oil on canvas, 60 × 92 cm, Art Institute of Chicago

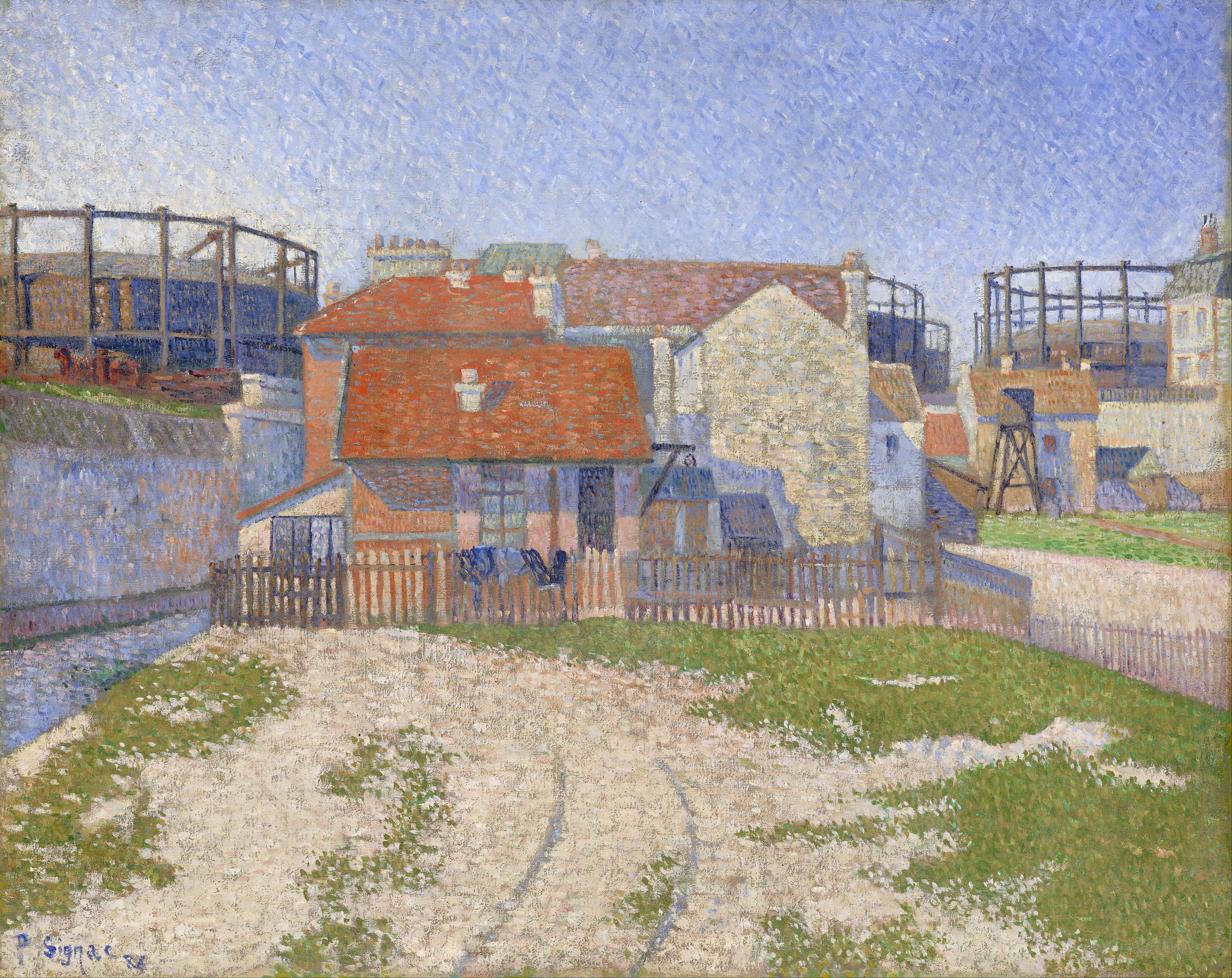
Gasometers at Clichy, 1886, National Gallery of Victoria, Melbourne

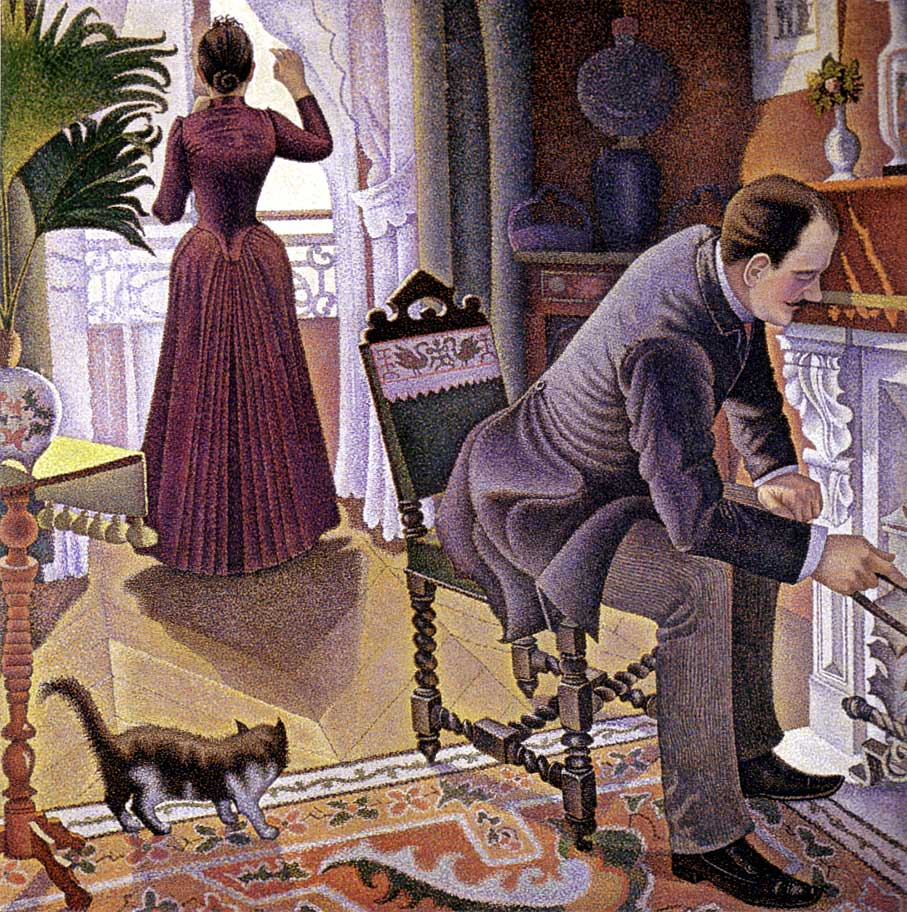
Sunday (Dimanche), 1889, Private Collection

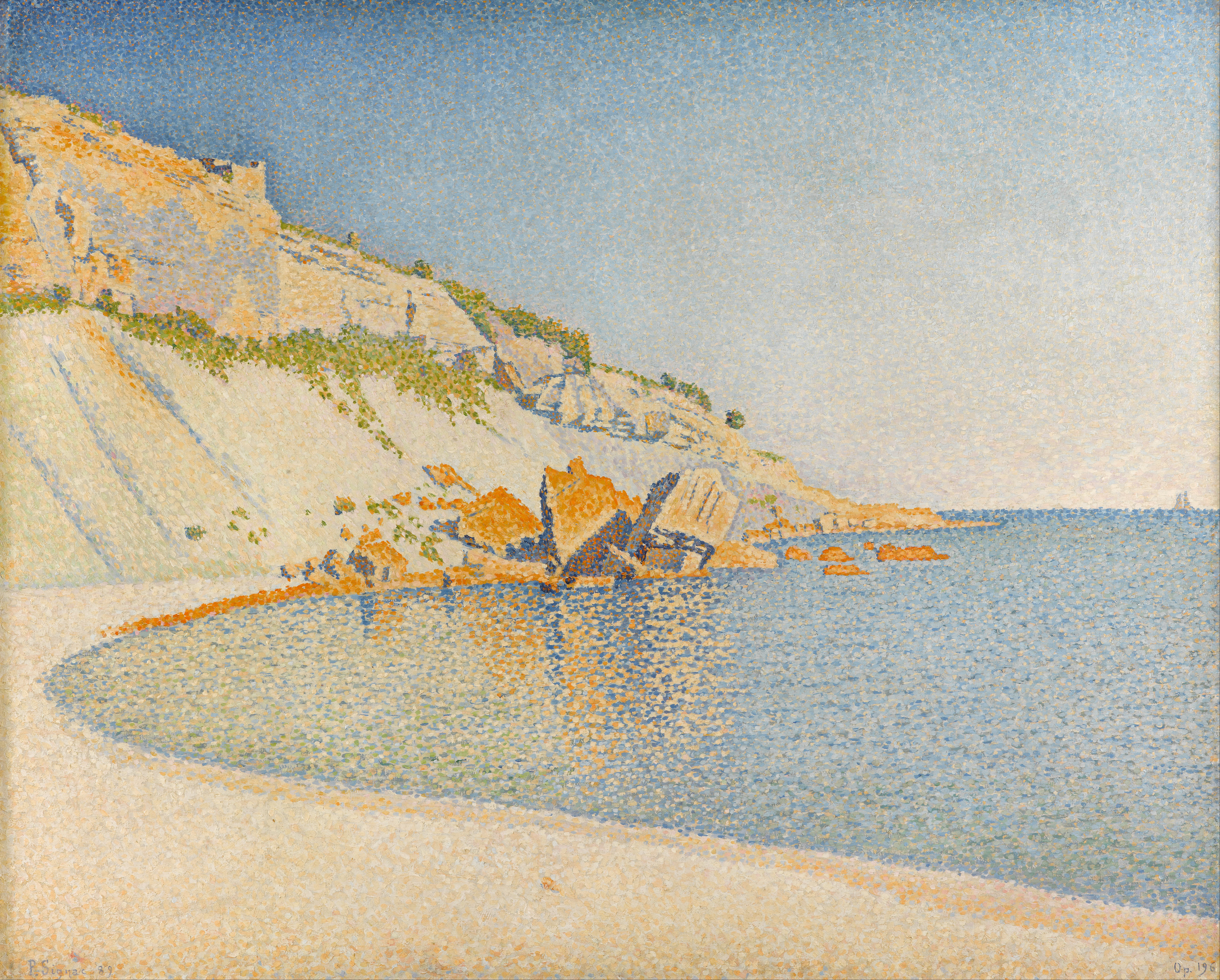
Cassis, Cap Lombard, Opus 196, 1889, Kunstmuseum Den Haag, The Hague

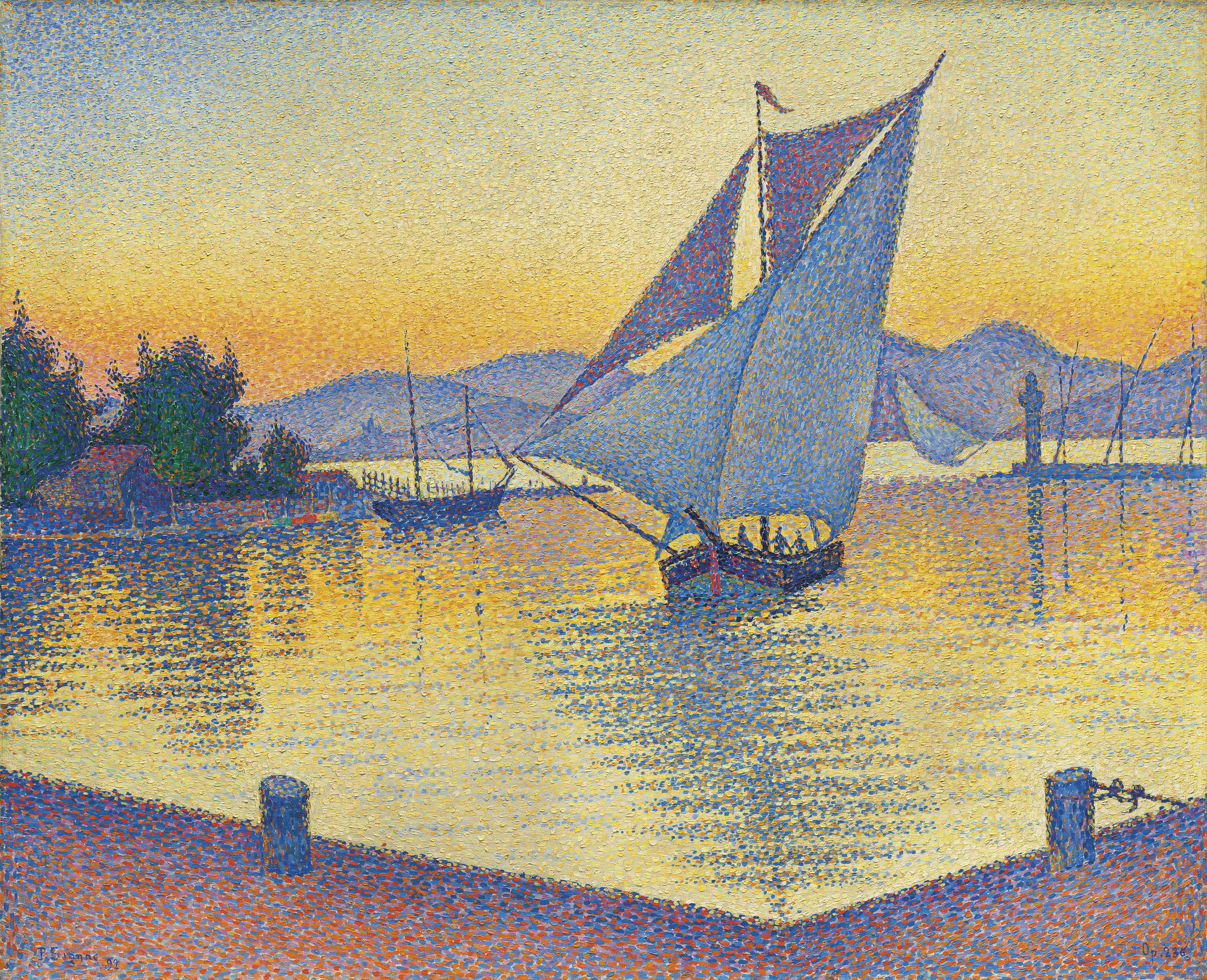
The Port at Sunset, 1892, Museum Barberini, Potsdam

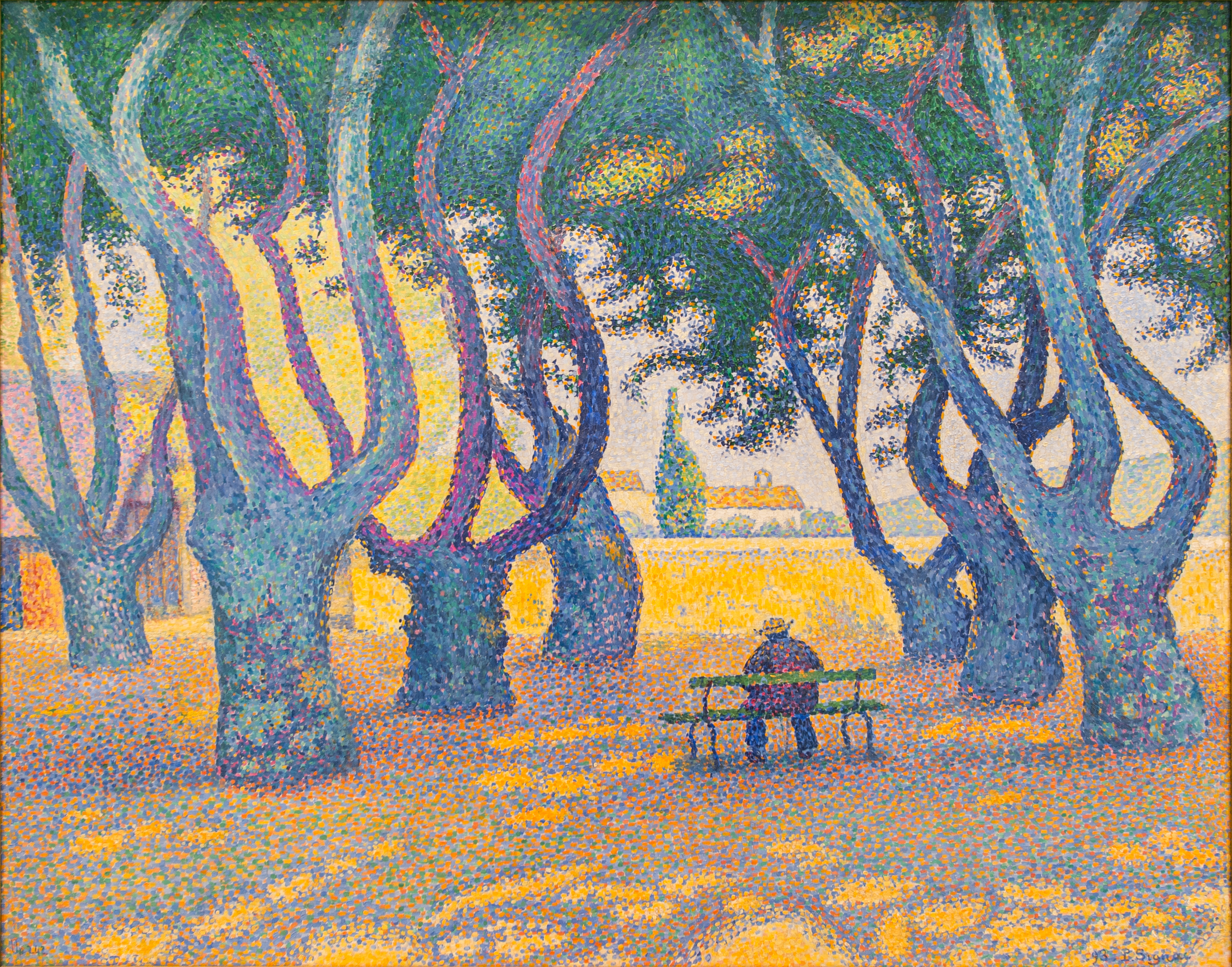
Place des Lices, 1893, oil on canvas, Carnegie Museum of Art, Pittsburgh

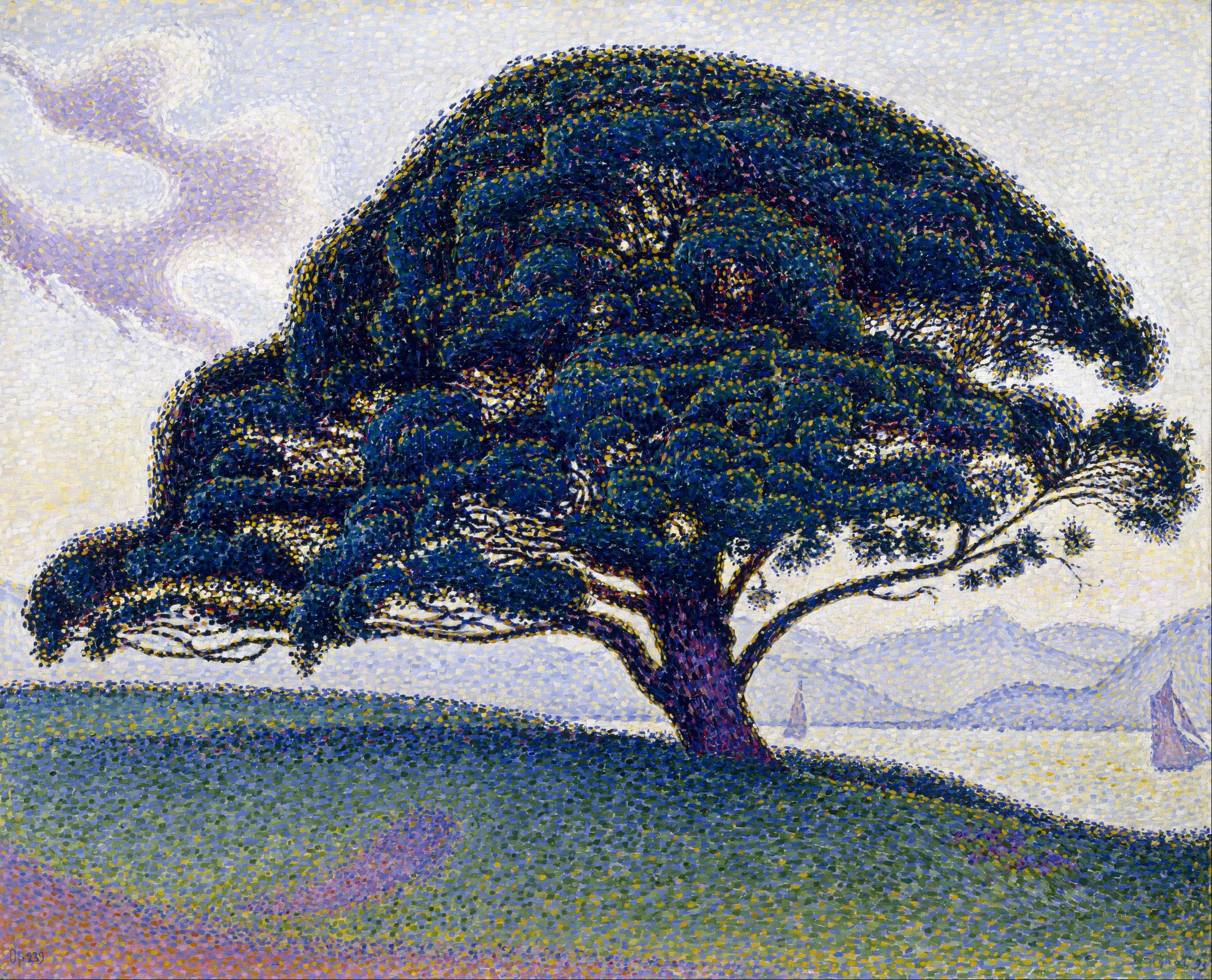
The Bonaventure Pine, 1893, Museum of Fine Arts, Houston

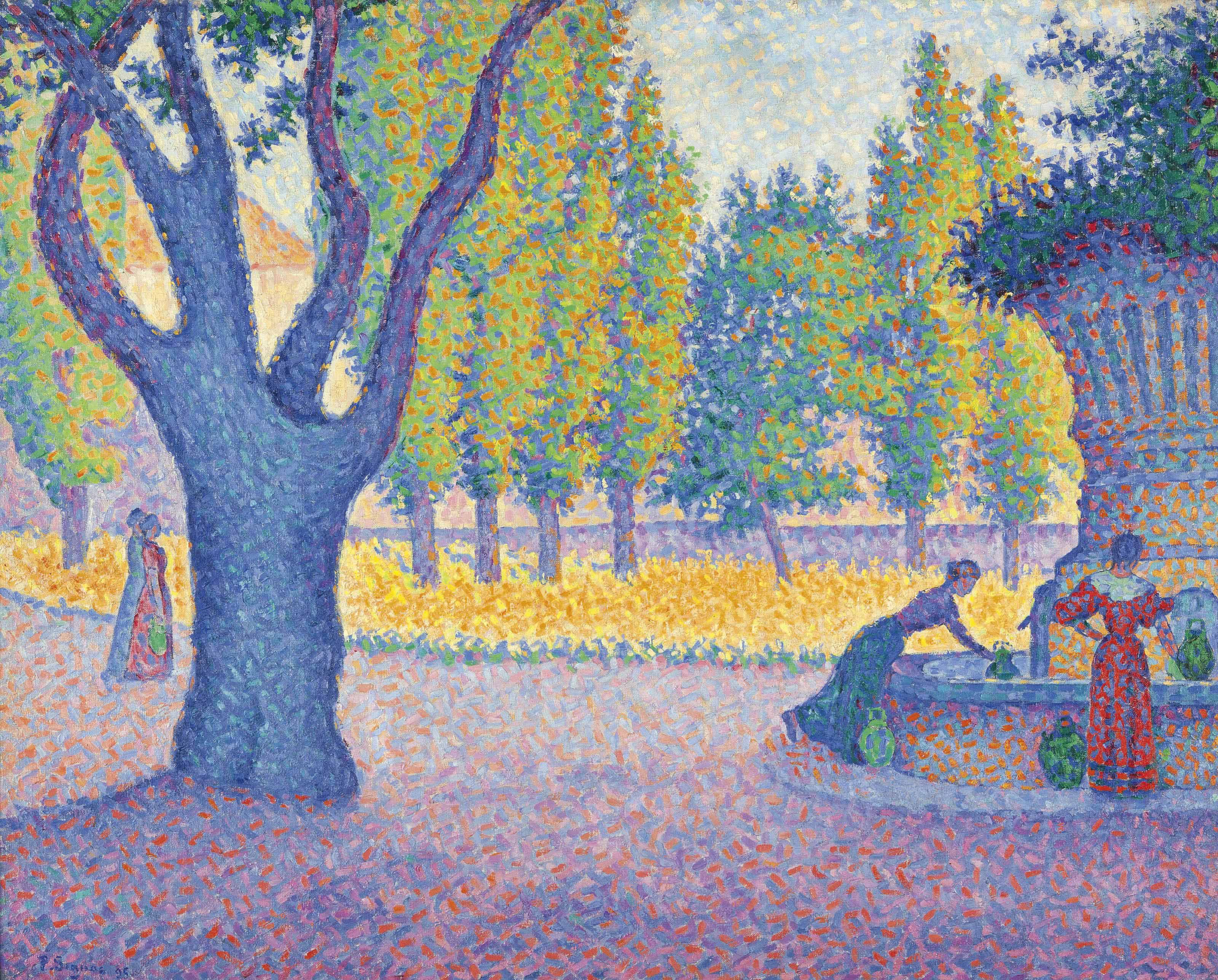
Saint-Tropez. Fontaine des Lices, 1895, Guggenheim Museum Bilbao

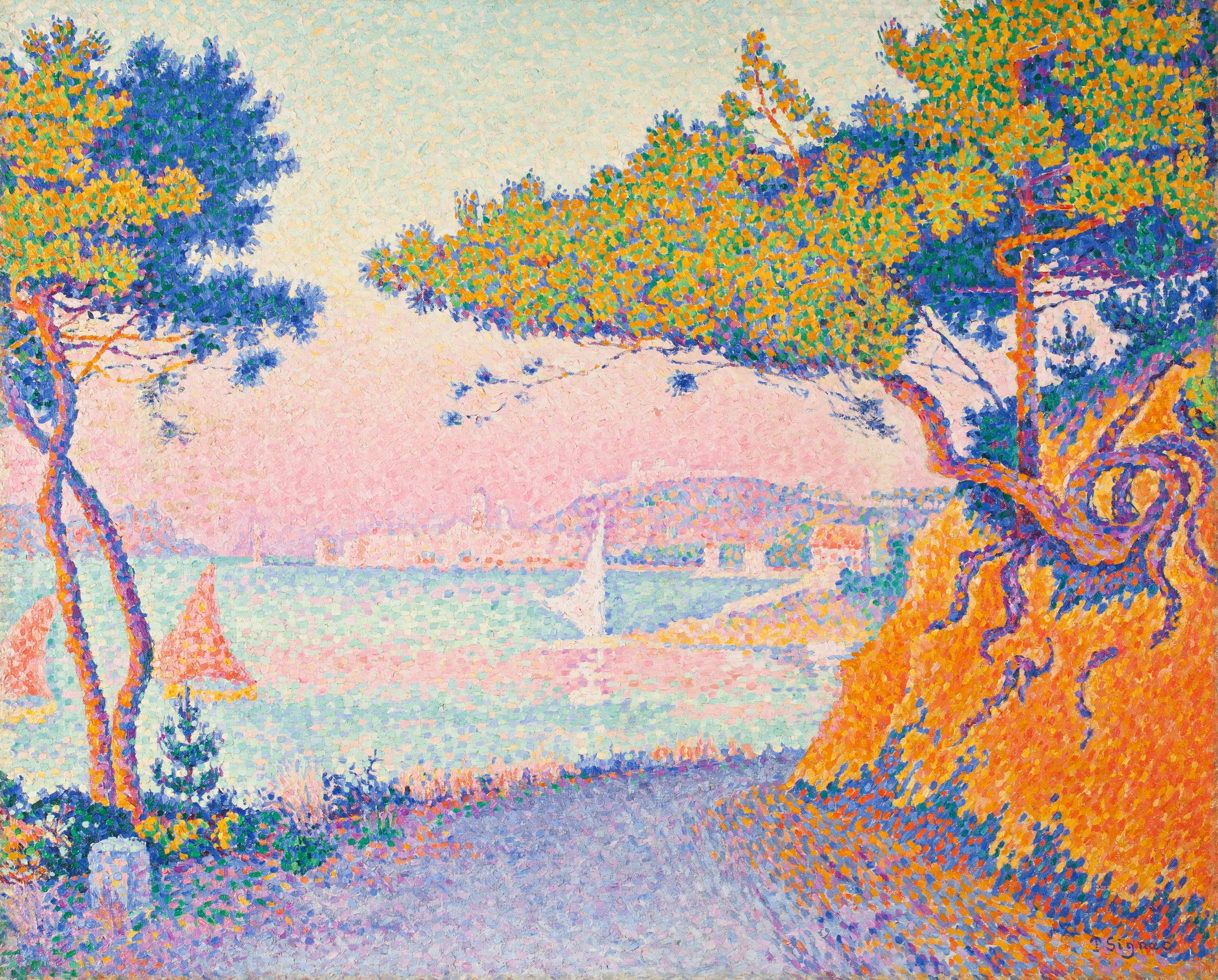
Golfe-Juan, ca. 1896, Worcester Art Museum

Le Démolisseur, c. 1897-1899, Musée d'Orsay, Paris

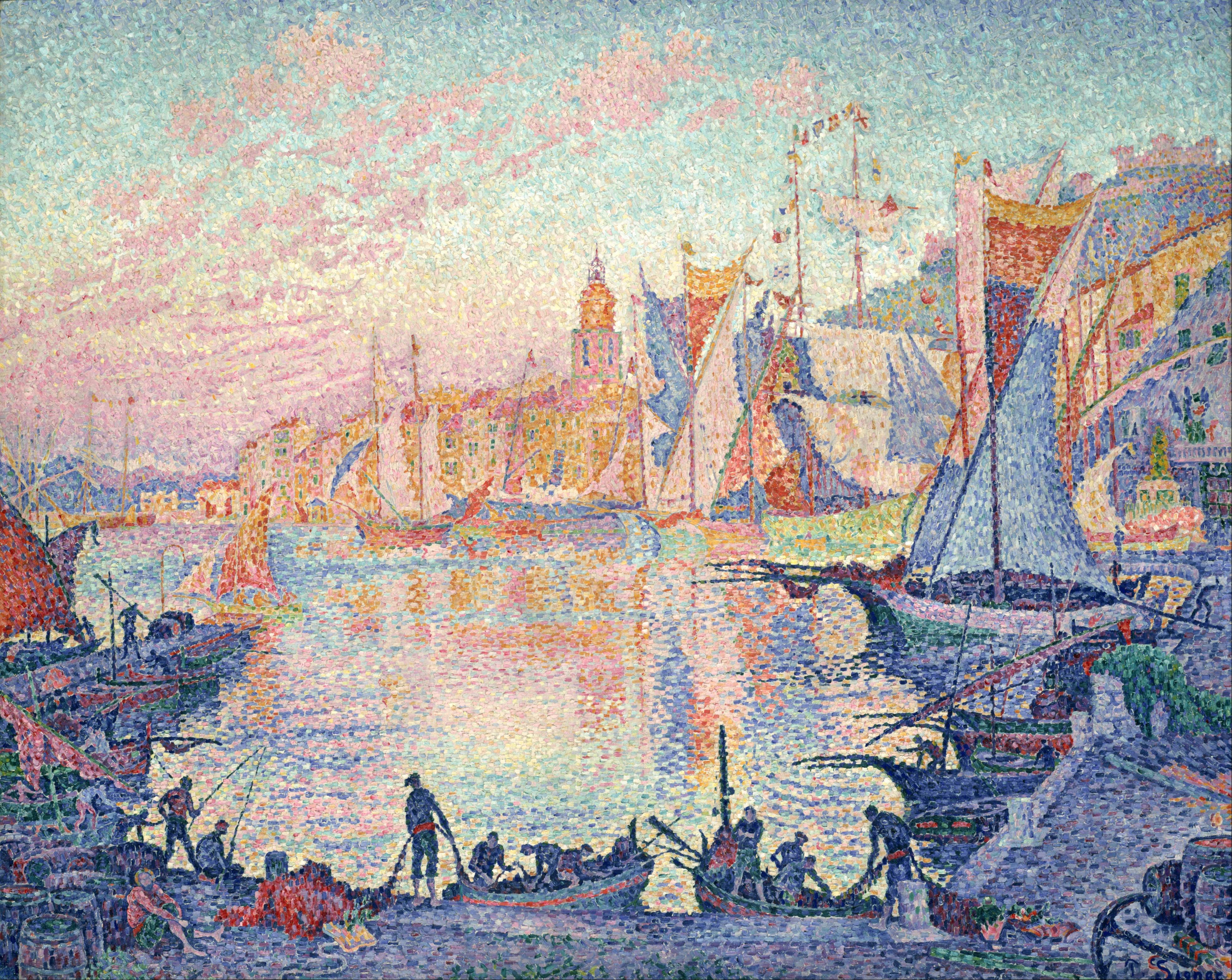
The Port of Saint-Tropez, 1901, oil on canvas, 131 x 161.5 cm (51.6 x 63.6 in), National Museum of Western Art, Tokyo

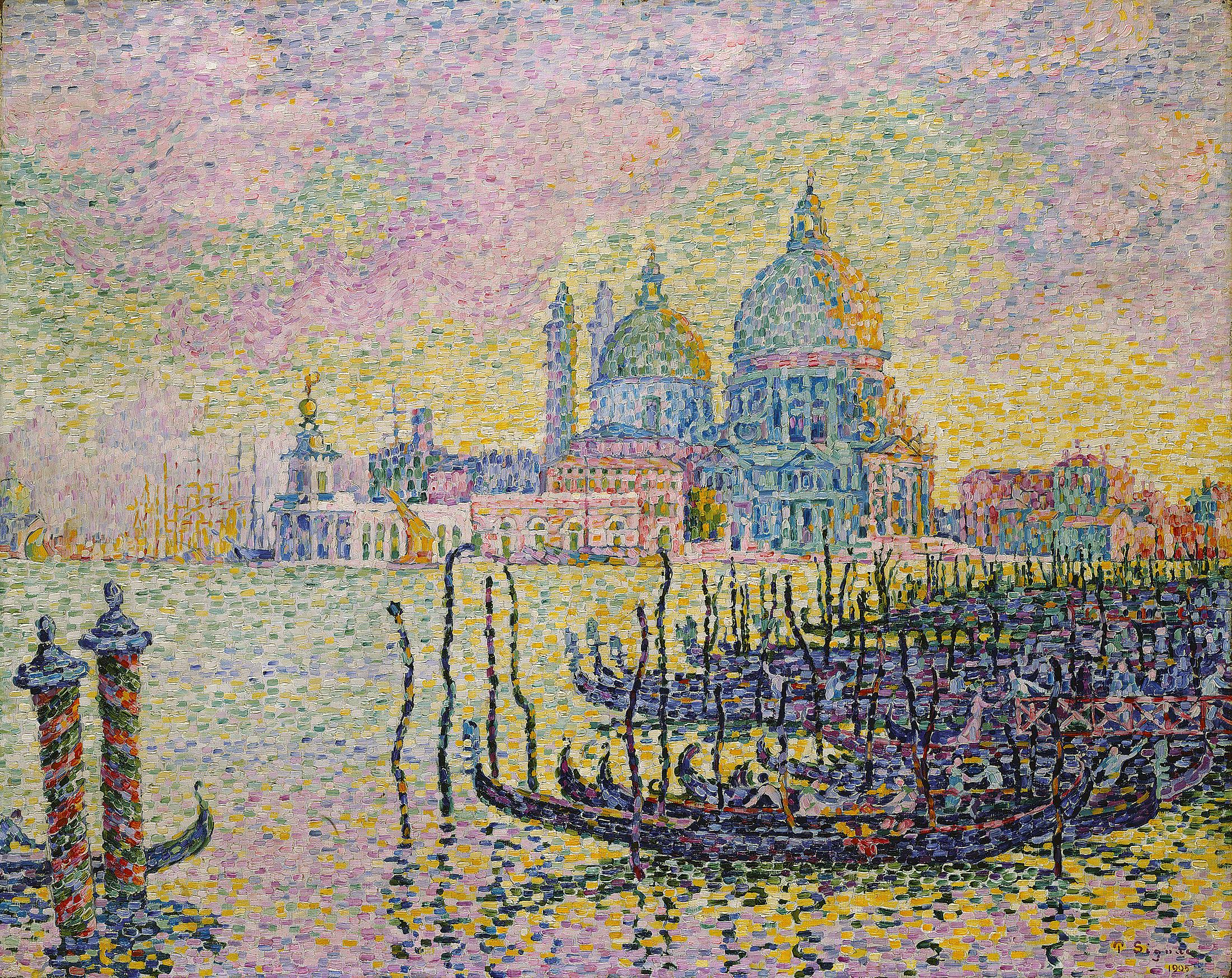
Grand Canal (Venice), 1905, Toledo Museum of Art, Toledo, Ohio

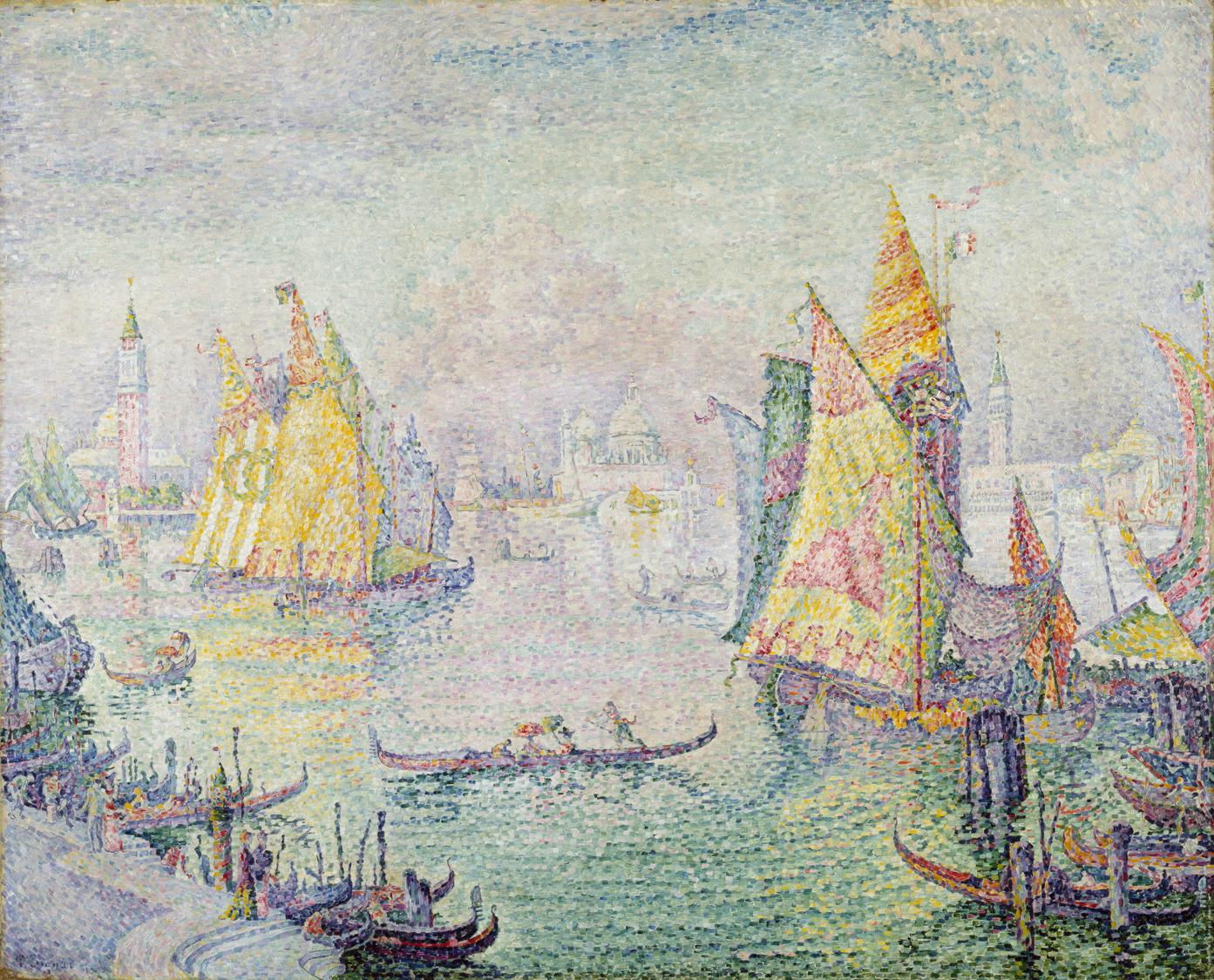
The Lagoon of Saint Mark, Venice, 1905 oil on canvas, 129.5 x 162.6 cm, Chrysler Museum of Art

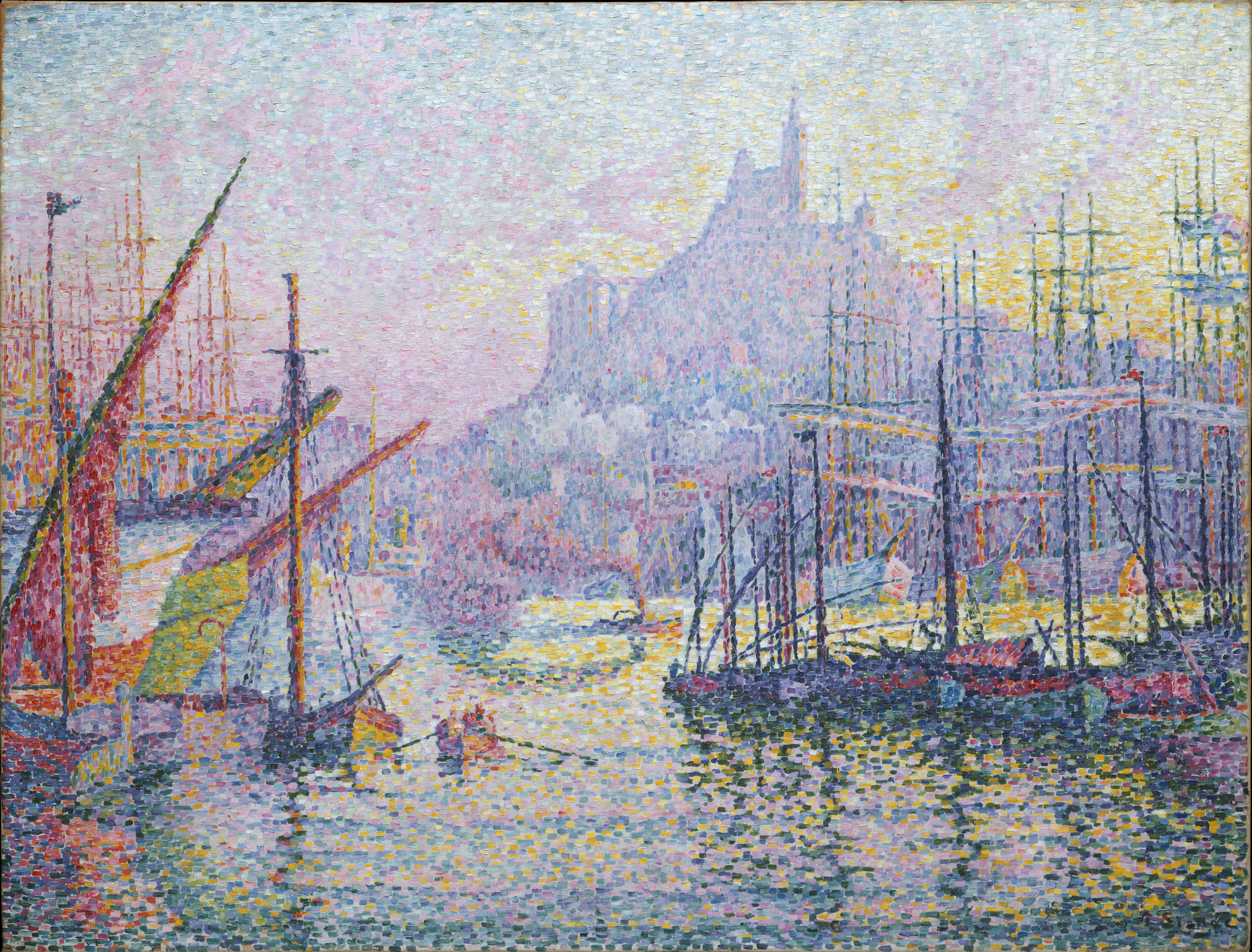
Notre-Dame-de-la-Garde (La Bonne-Mère) Marseilles, 1905–06, Metropolitan Museum of Art

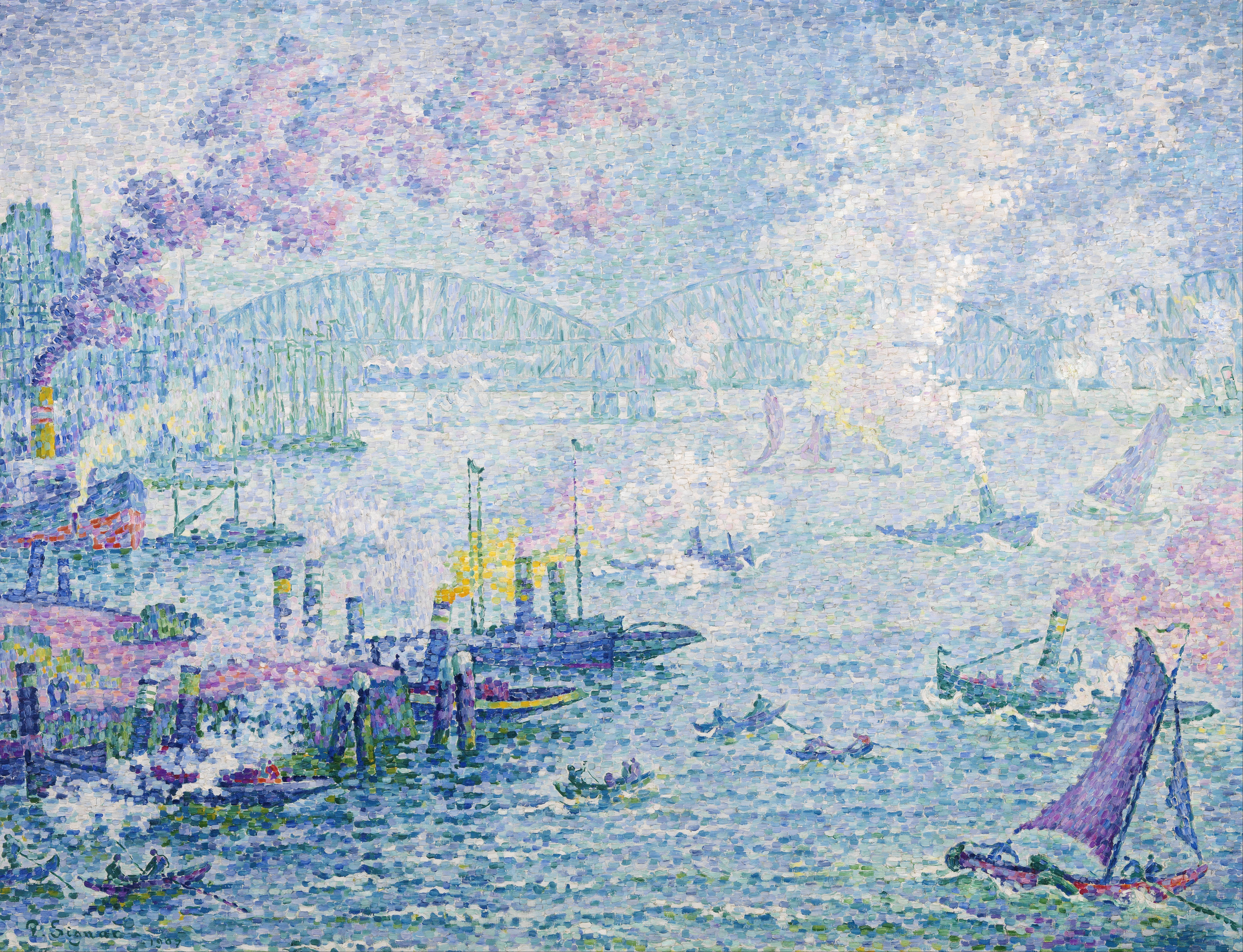
The Port of Rotterdam, 1907, Museum Boijmans Van Beuningen

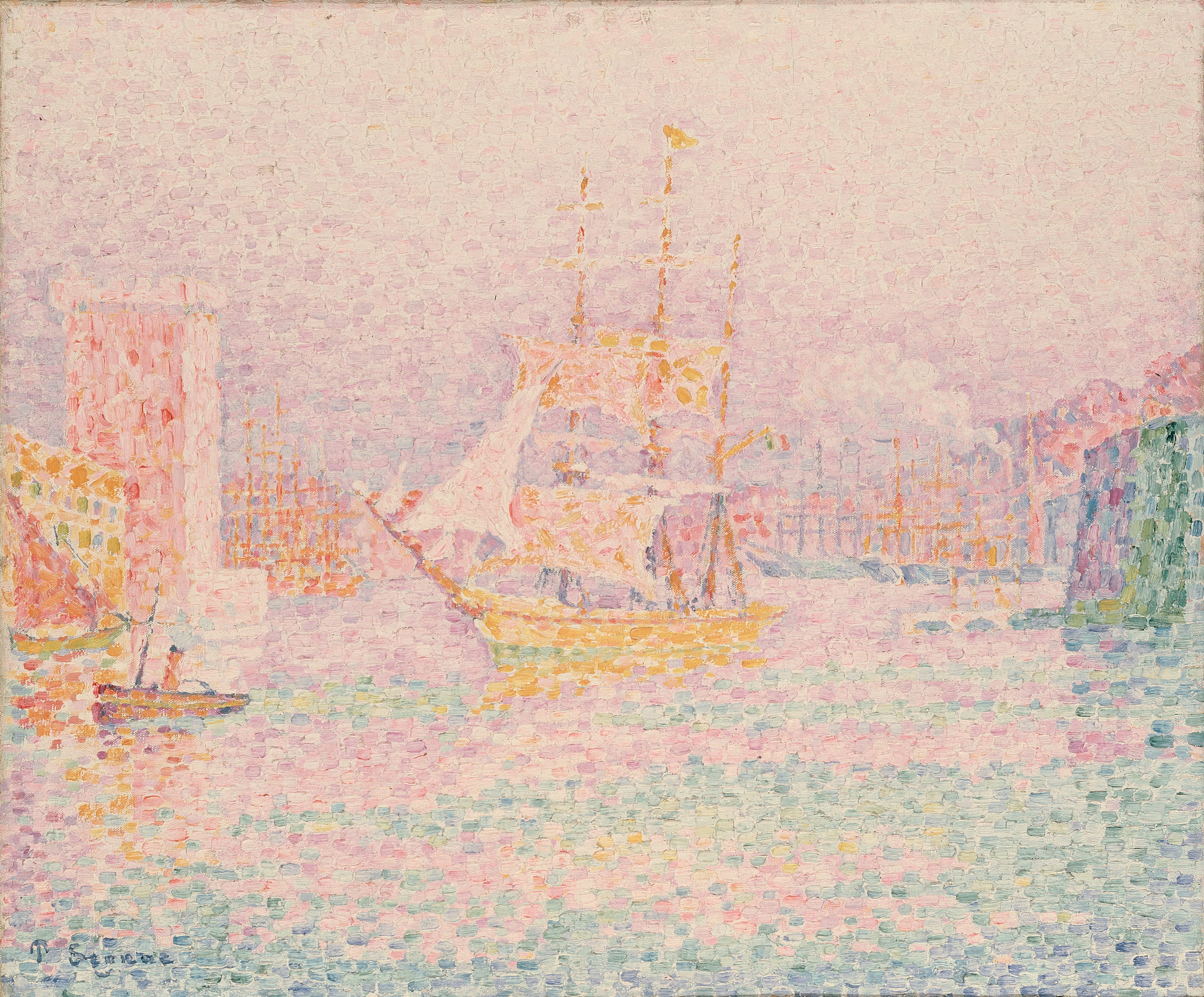
The Port of Marseille, 1907, Hermitage Museum

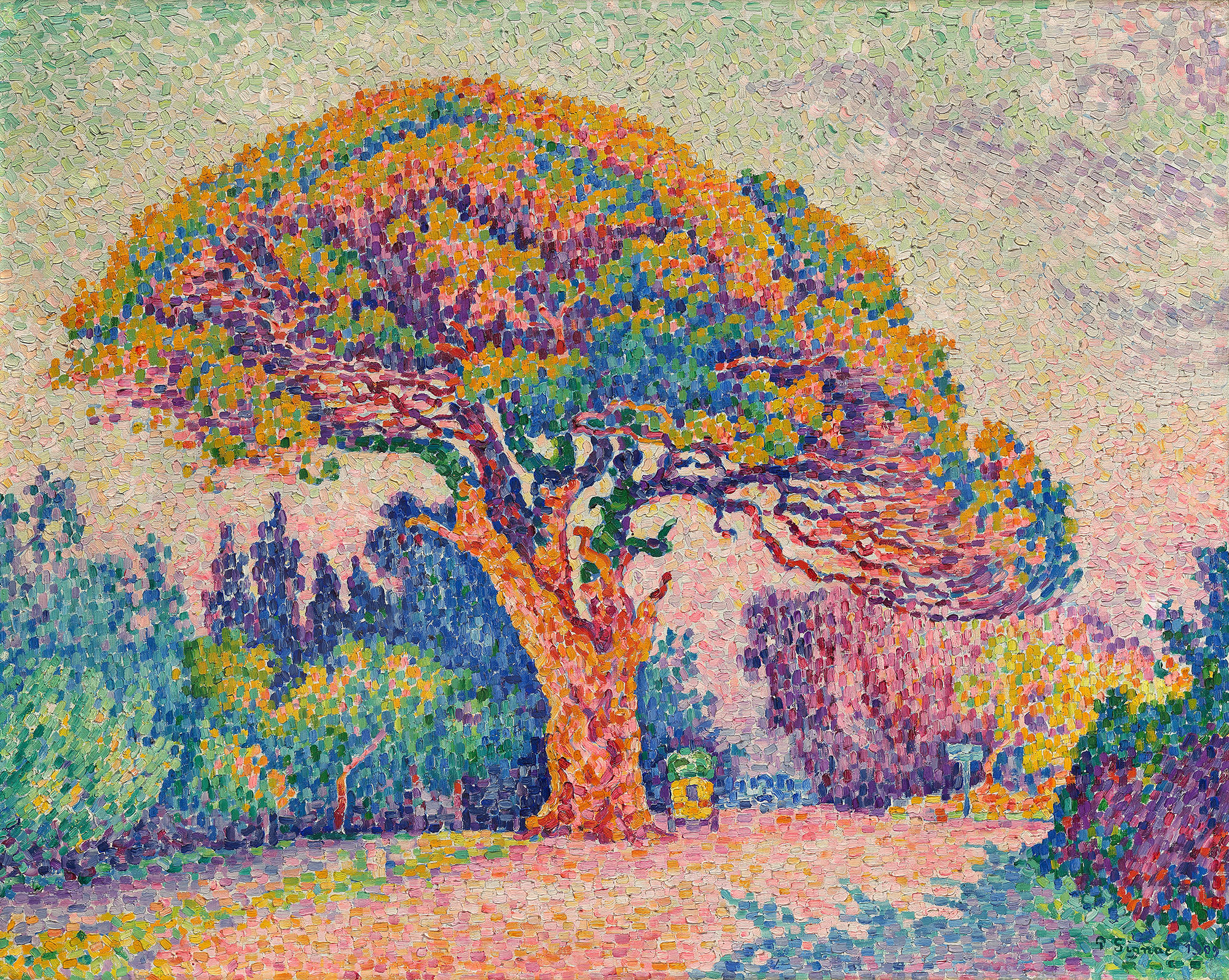
The Pine Tree at Saint Tropez, 1909, Pushkin Museum, Moscow

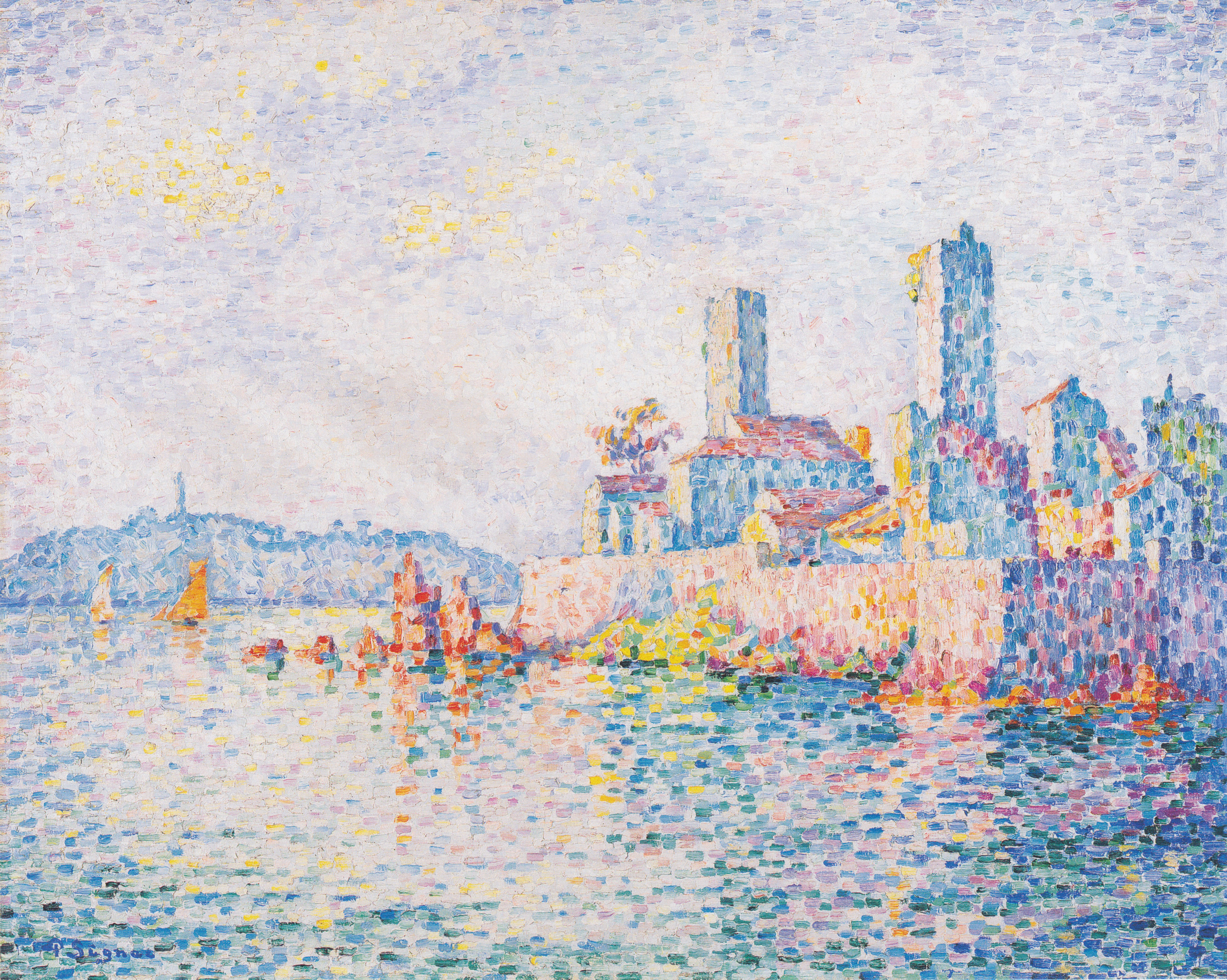
Antibes, 1911, Albertina, Vienna

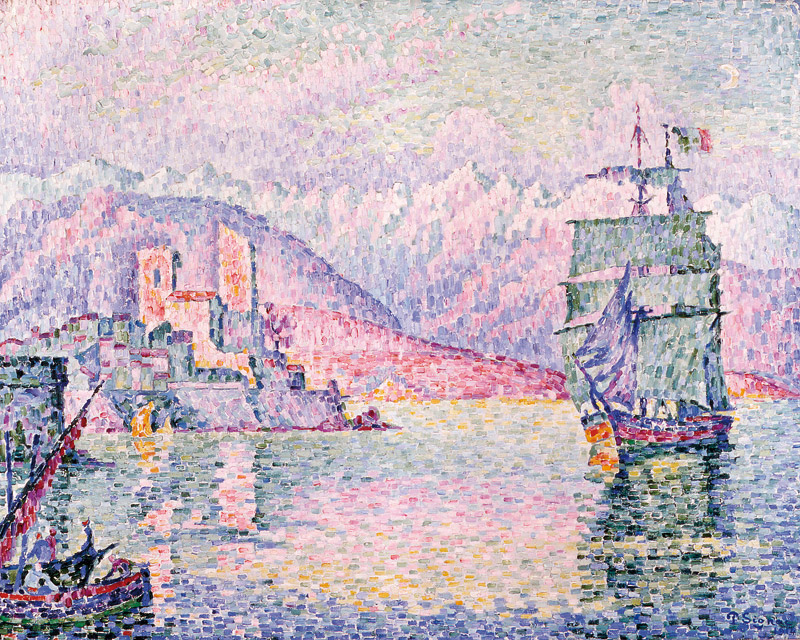
Antibes le soir, 1914, Strasbourg Museum of Modern and Contemporary Art

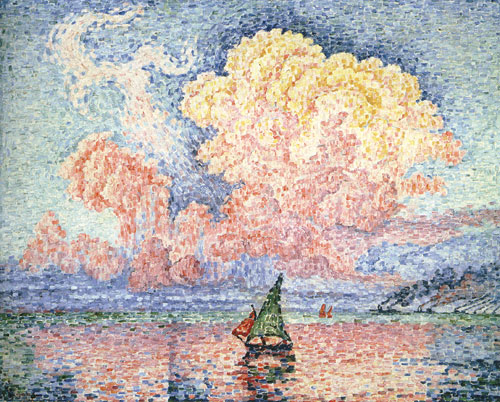
Antibes, The Pink Cloud, 1916, oil on canvas, 92 x 36 cm (36 x 28 in), Museum Of Fine Arts, Boston

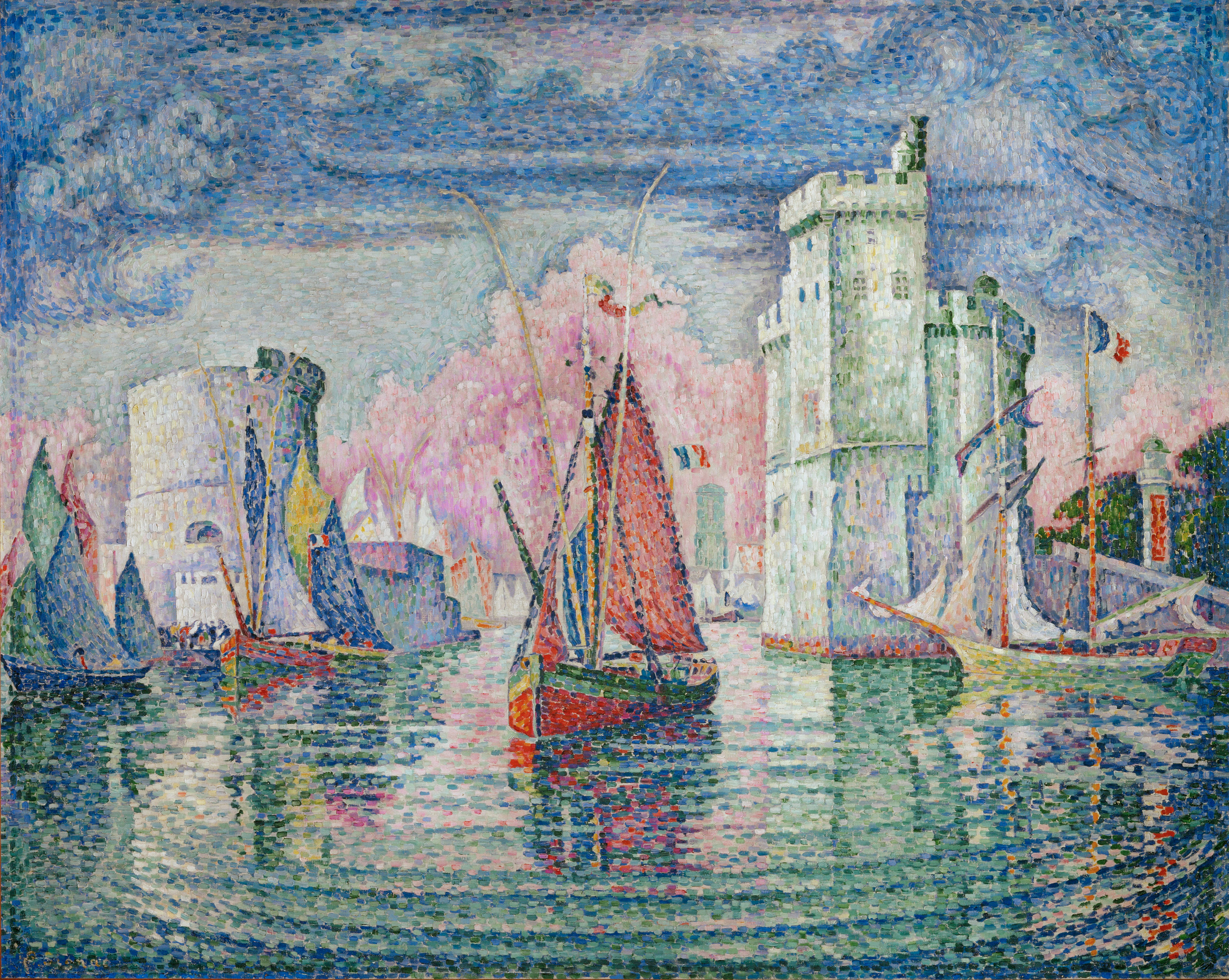
Entrée du port de la Rochelle, 1921, oil on canvas, 130.5 x 162 cm (51.4 × 63.8 in), Musée d'Orsay

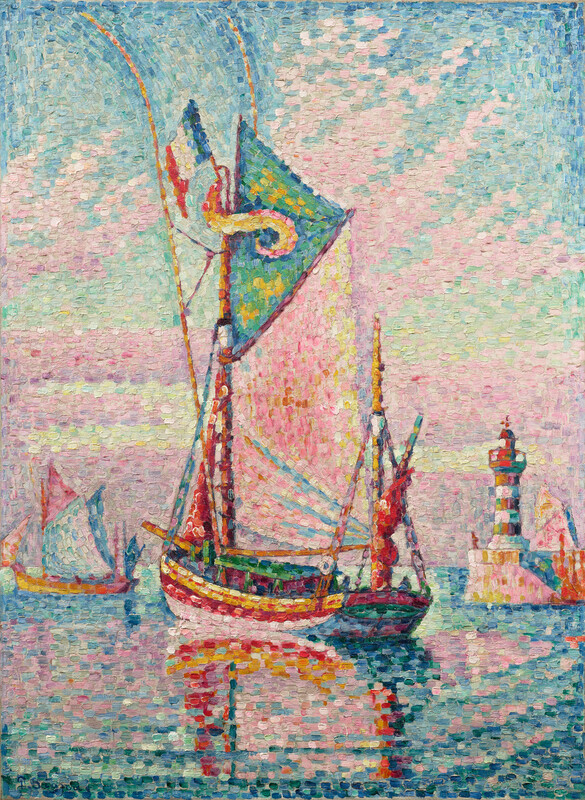
Port of Concarneau, 1925, Artizon Museum, Tokyo

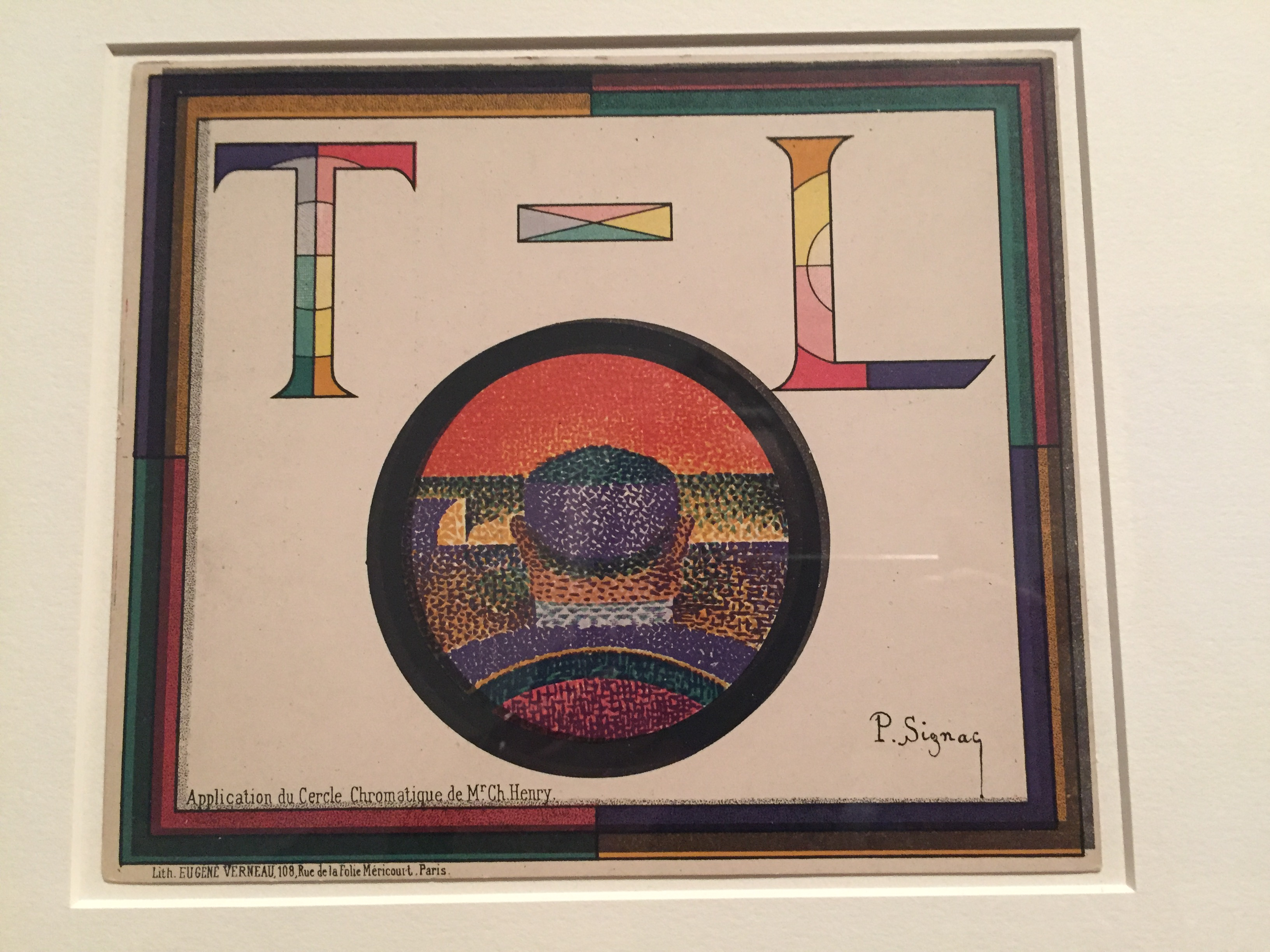
Application of Mr. Charles Henry's Chromatic Circle, 1888, by Paul Signac.

== Illustrations in periodicals ==
- L'almanach de Cocagne pour l'an 1920–1922, Dédié aux vrais Gourmands Et aux Francs Buveurs (1921), published by Jean Cocteau and Bertrand Guégan (1892–1943)
- La Gerbe (Nantes), periodical.

== See also ==
- List of Orientalist artists
- Orientalism
- The Lagoon of Saint Mark, Venice (1905)

One-hundred-and-thirty-three watercolors and drawings by Signac are in the collection of the Arkansas Museum of Fine Arts, which is the largest assemblage of Signac’s graphic art outside of France. The collection was donated in 1999 by philanthropist James T. Dyke.
