= Jeanne Selmersheim-Desgrange =

20th-century French painter (1887-1958)

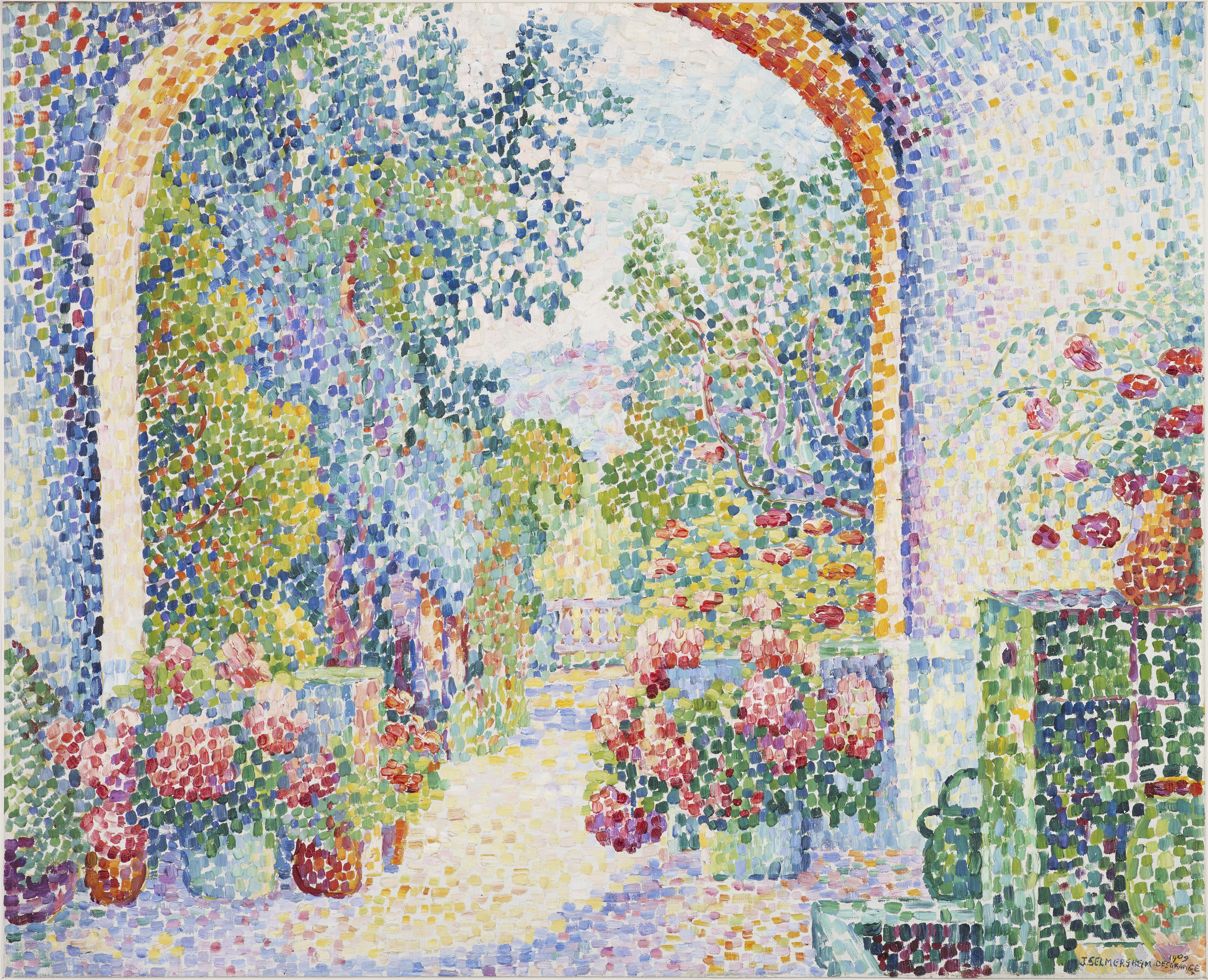
Garden at La Hune Saint-Tropez (1909) at the Indianapolis Museum of Art

Jeanne Selmersheim-Desgrange (1877–1958) was a French neo-impressionist painter who used the art technique of pointillism with her main themes of flowers and gardens. Her painting, Garden at La Hune, Saint-Tropez (1909), shows her signature use of “high-key colors and block-like strokes.”

Some of her oil on canvas works are Garden at La Hune, Saint Tropez (1909) (Image on Right), The Flowers, In the Garden (1909), Table blanche, vue sur Saint-Tropez (c. 1930), The Garden, Afternoon Tea, Flowers in the Window, and Bouquet of Flowers.

Selmersheim-Desgrange, raised in a family of artists and architects, became an art student of Paul Signac and later, in 1910, his companion. At the time, Signac was married to Bertha (Robles), and Selmersheim-Desgrange was married to Pierre Desgrange with whom she had three children. In September 1912, Signac and Selmersheim-Desgrange moved to a rented villa in Cap d'Antibes, France and in October 1912 she gave birth to their daughter Ginnette Laurie Anaiis.

In July 1961, Selmersheim-Desgrange’s painting, The Flowers, was one of 57 modern art paintings stolen from the Annonciade Museum of Modern Art in Saint-Tropez, France.
