= Collection of the National Gallery =

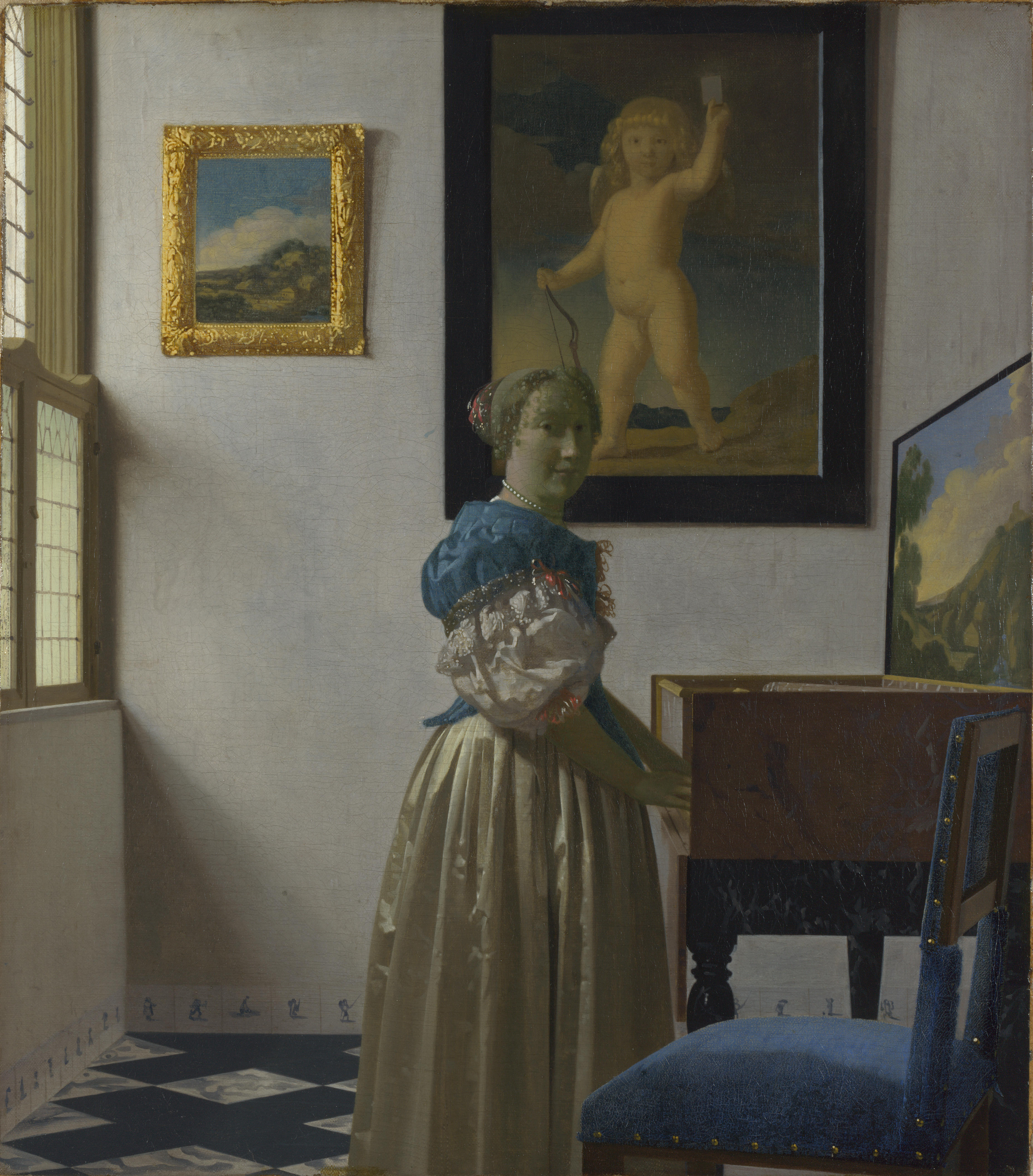
Johannes Vermeer, Lady Standing at a Virginal (1670–1672).

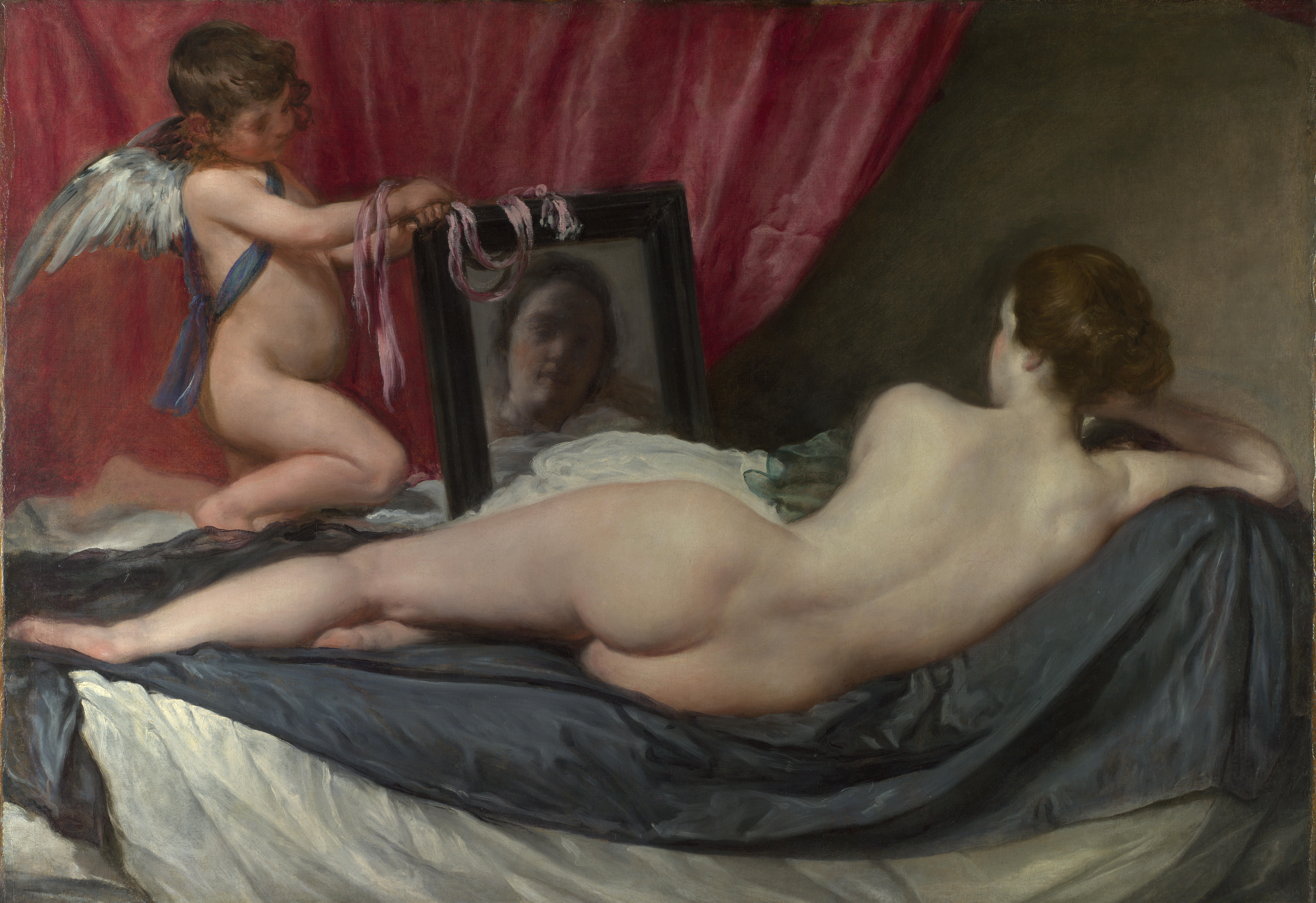
Diego Velázquez, Rokeby Venus (1647–51).

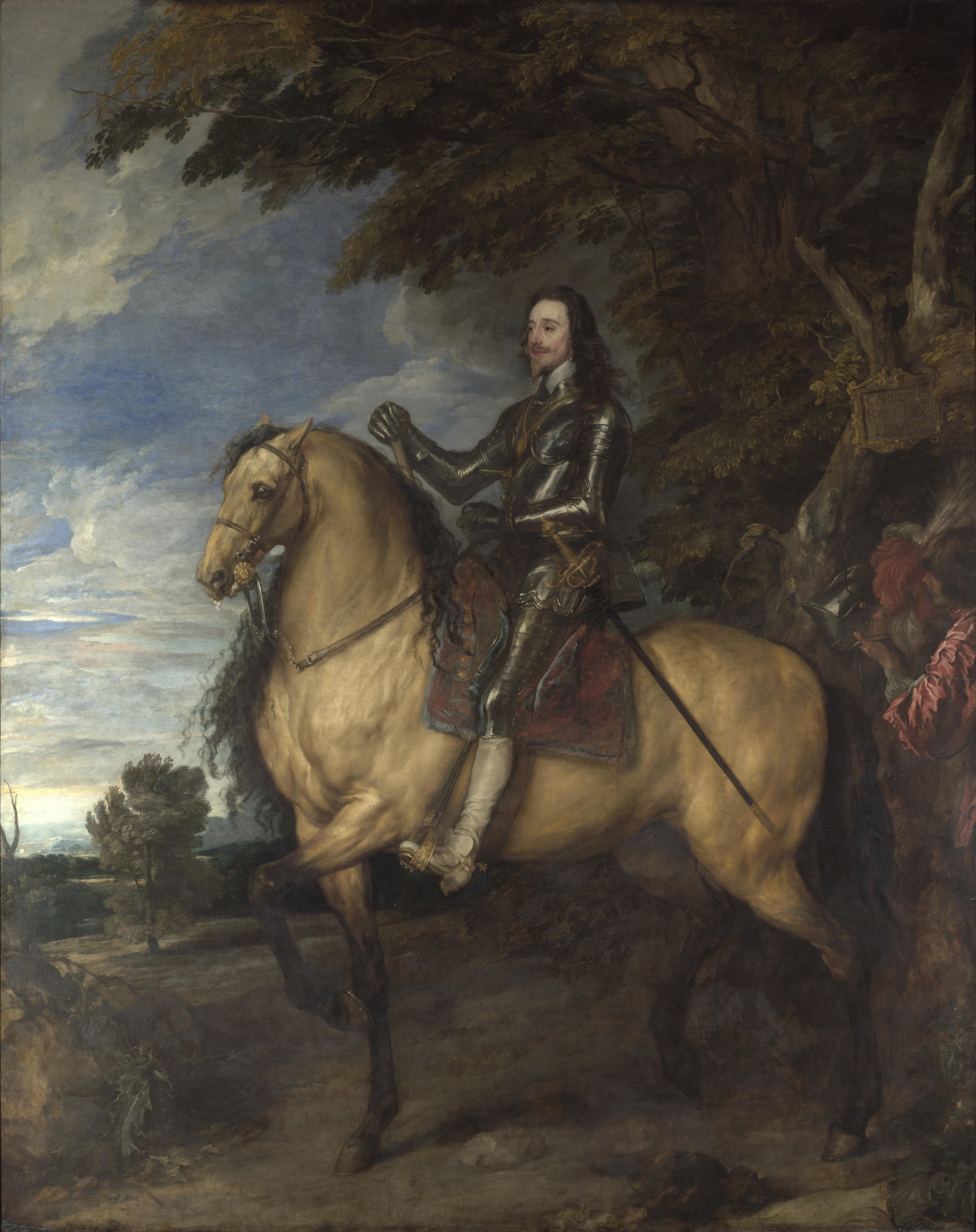
Anthony van Dyck, Equestrian Portrait of Charles I (1637–1638).

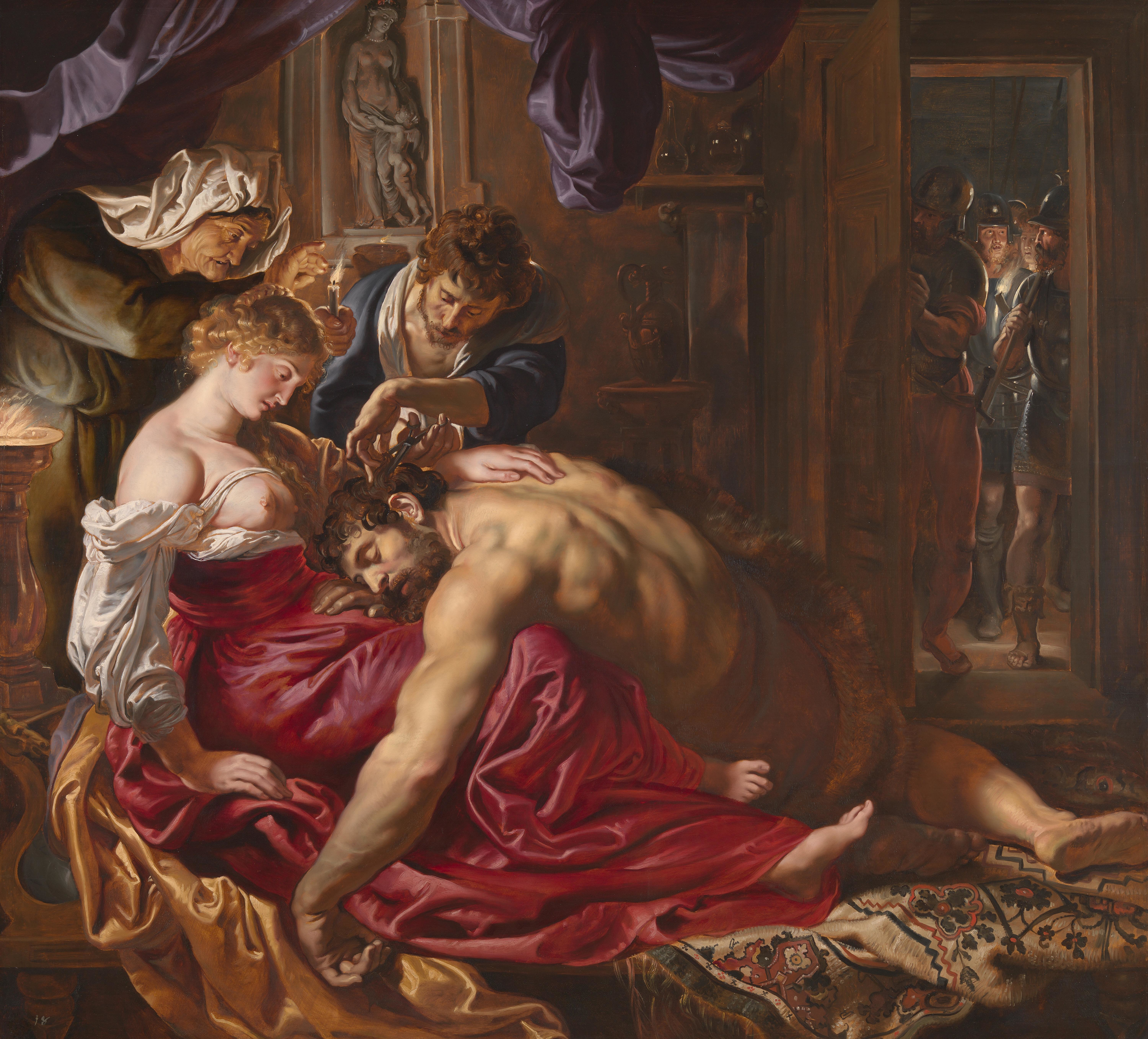
Peter Paul Rubens, Samson and Delilah (1609–10).

The National Gallery is the primary British national public art gallery, sited on Trafalgar Square, in central London. It is home to one of the world's greatest collections of Western European paintings. Founded in 1824, from an initial purchase of 36 paintings by the British Government, its collections have since grown to about 2,300 paintings by roughly 750 artists dating from the mid-13th century to 1900, most of which are on display. This page lists some of the highlights of the collection.

For the list of all named painters in the collection and their works, see Catalogue of paintings in the National Gallery, London.

== Paintings highlights ==
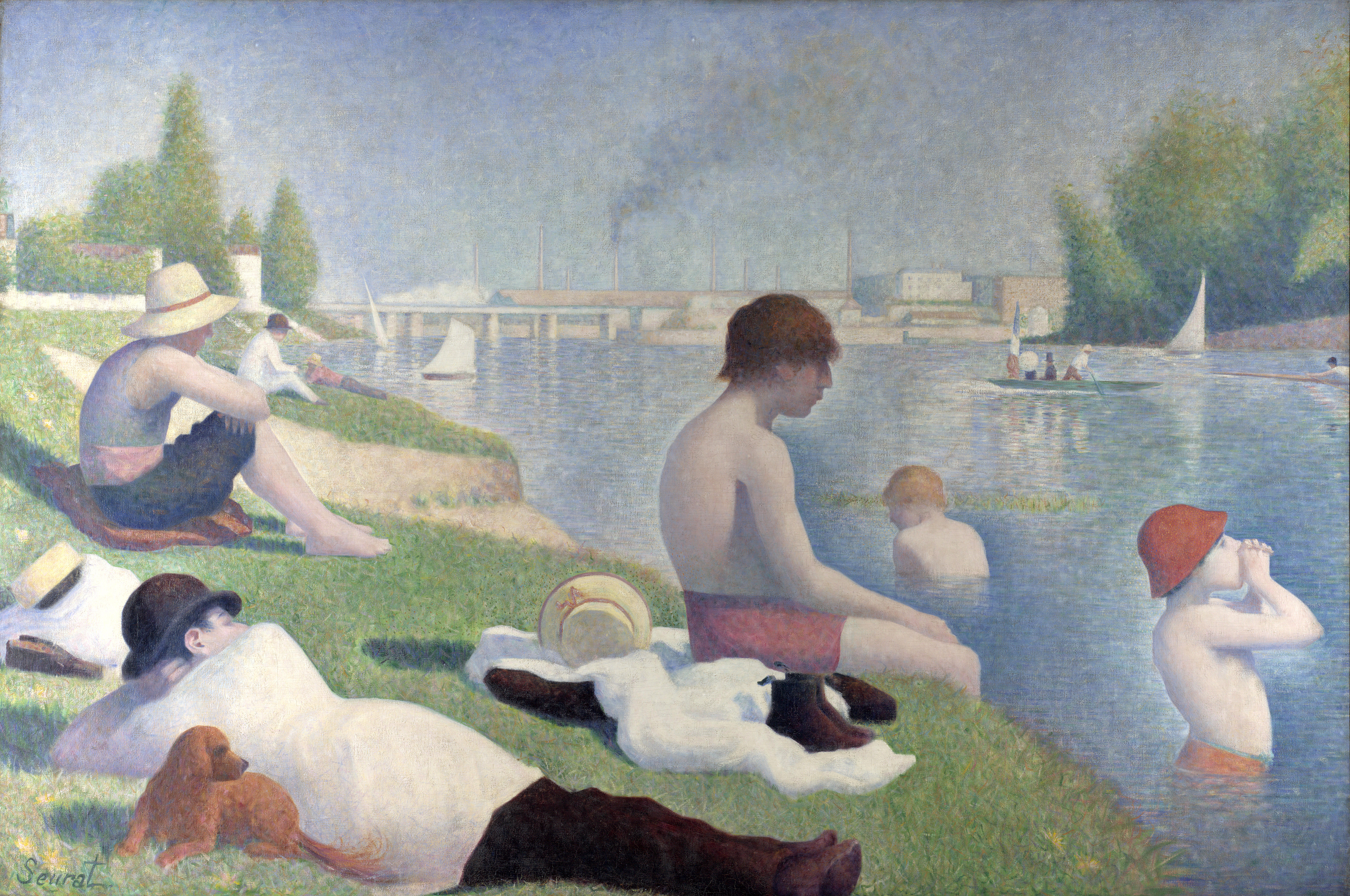
Georges-Pierre Seurat, Bathers at Asnières (1884).

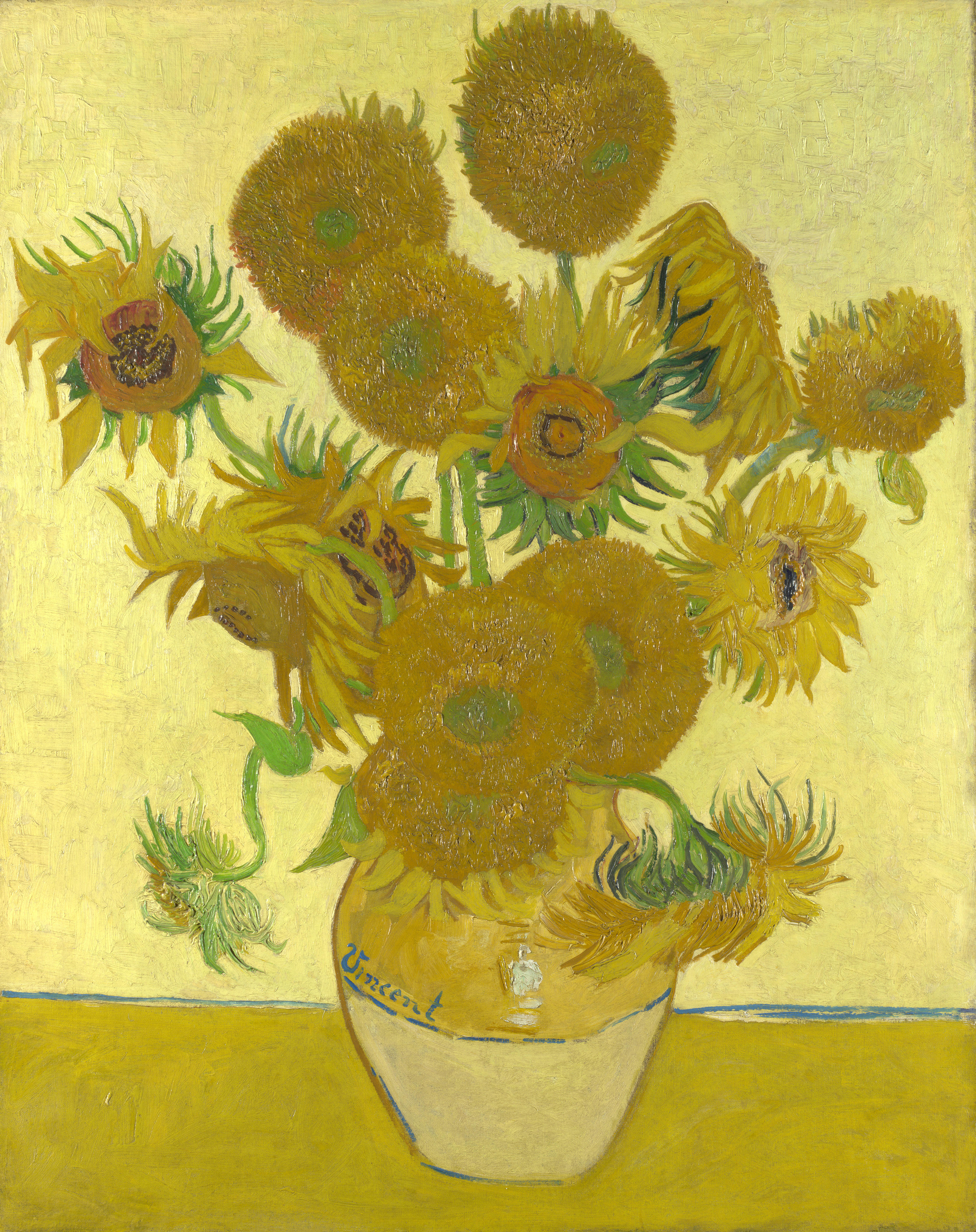
Vincent van Gogh, Sunflowers (1888).

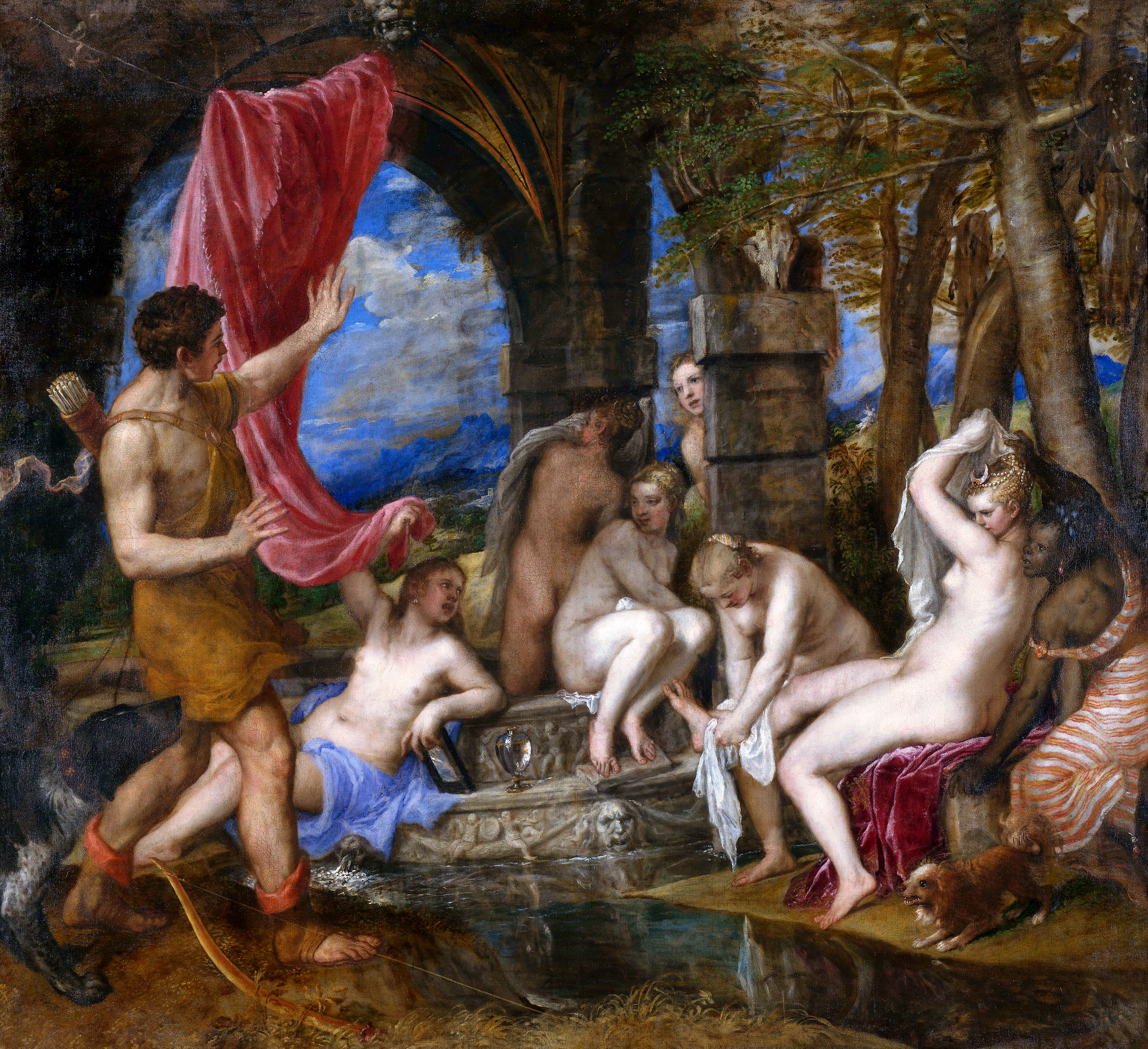
Titian, Diana and Actaeon (1556), jointly with the National Gallery of Scotland.

Hans Holbein the Younger, The Ambassadors (1533).

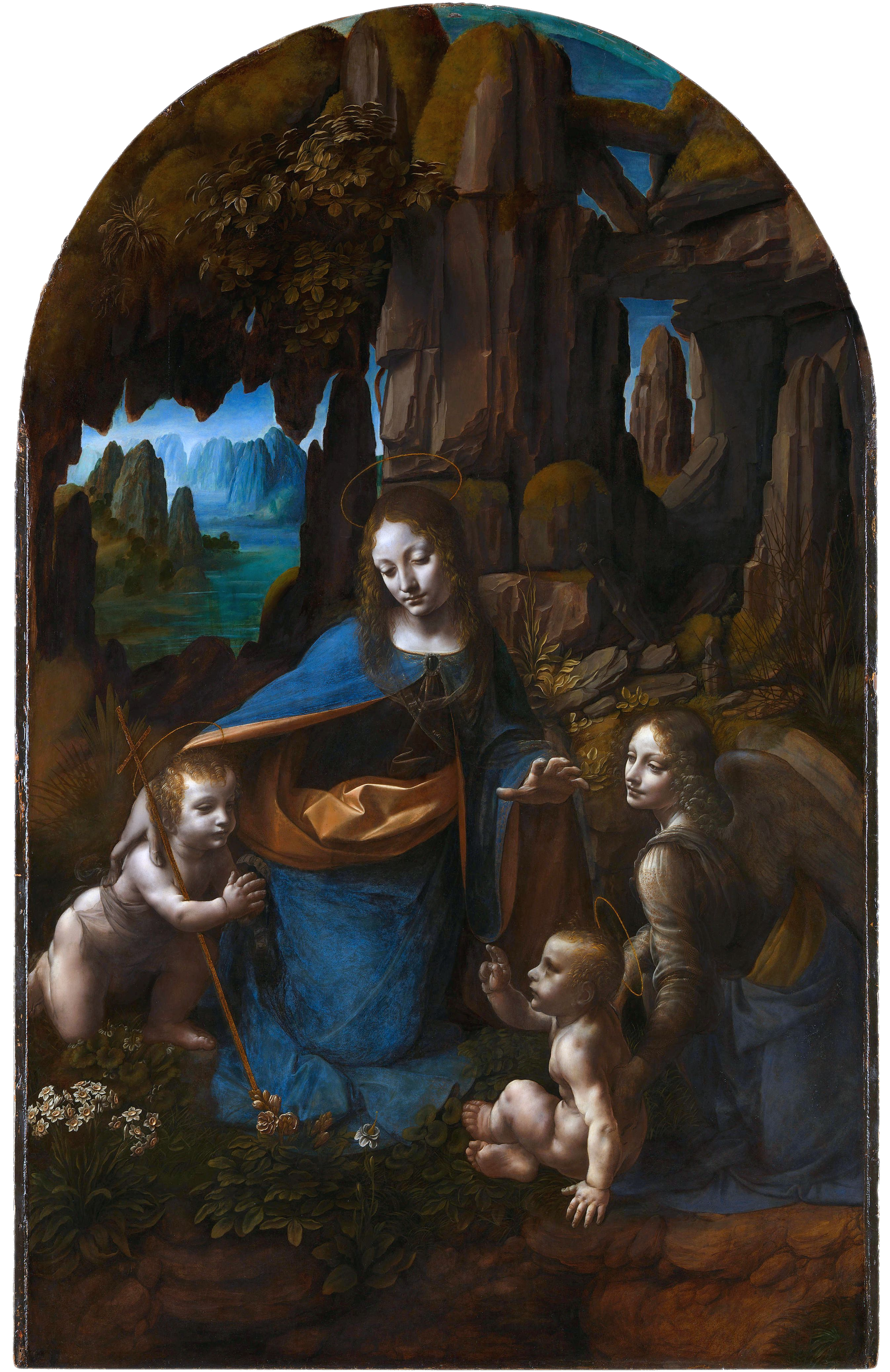
Leonardo da Vinci – The Virgin of the Rocks (1495–1508).

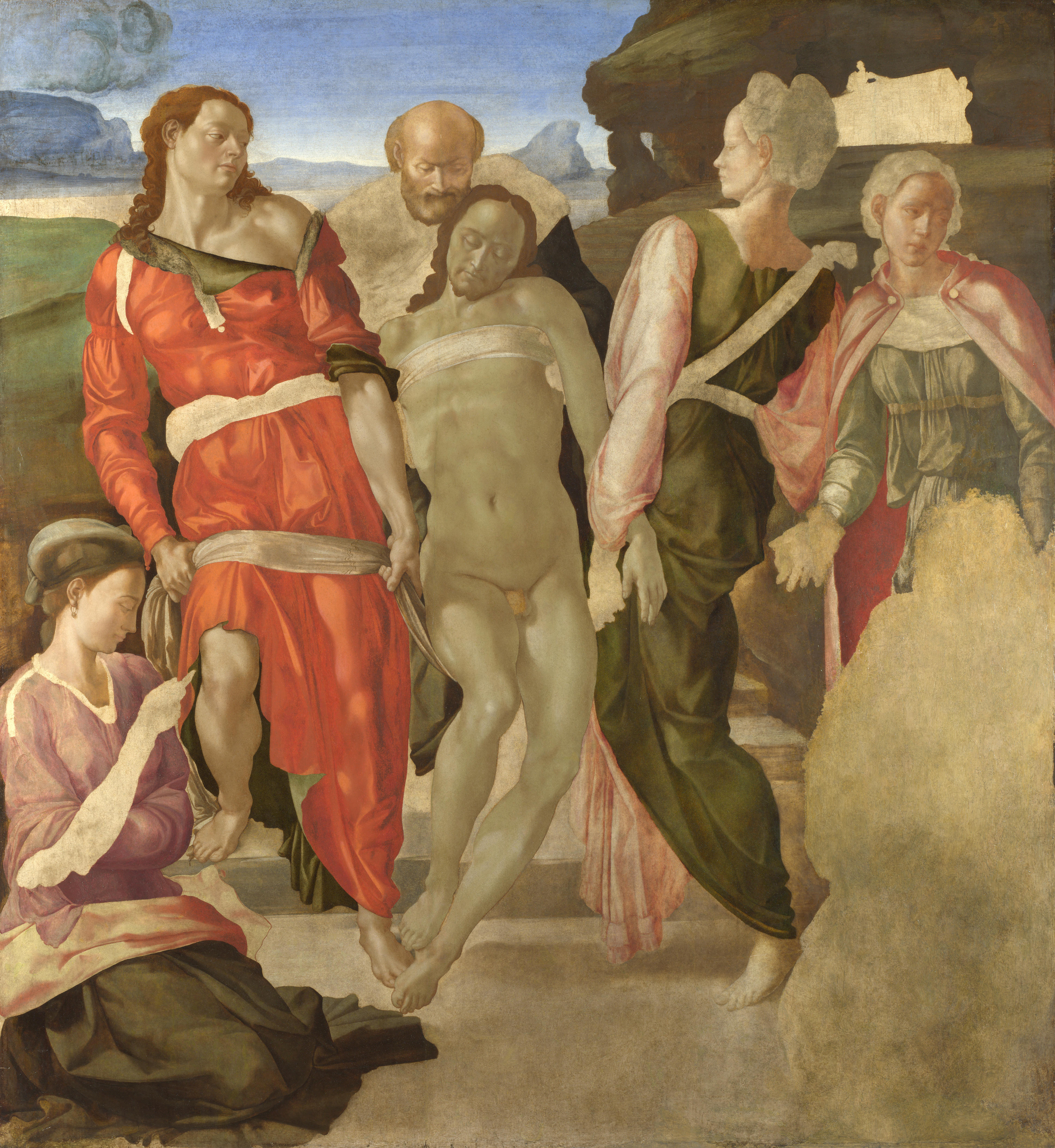
Michelangelo, The Entombment (1500–1501).

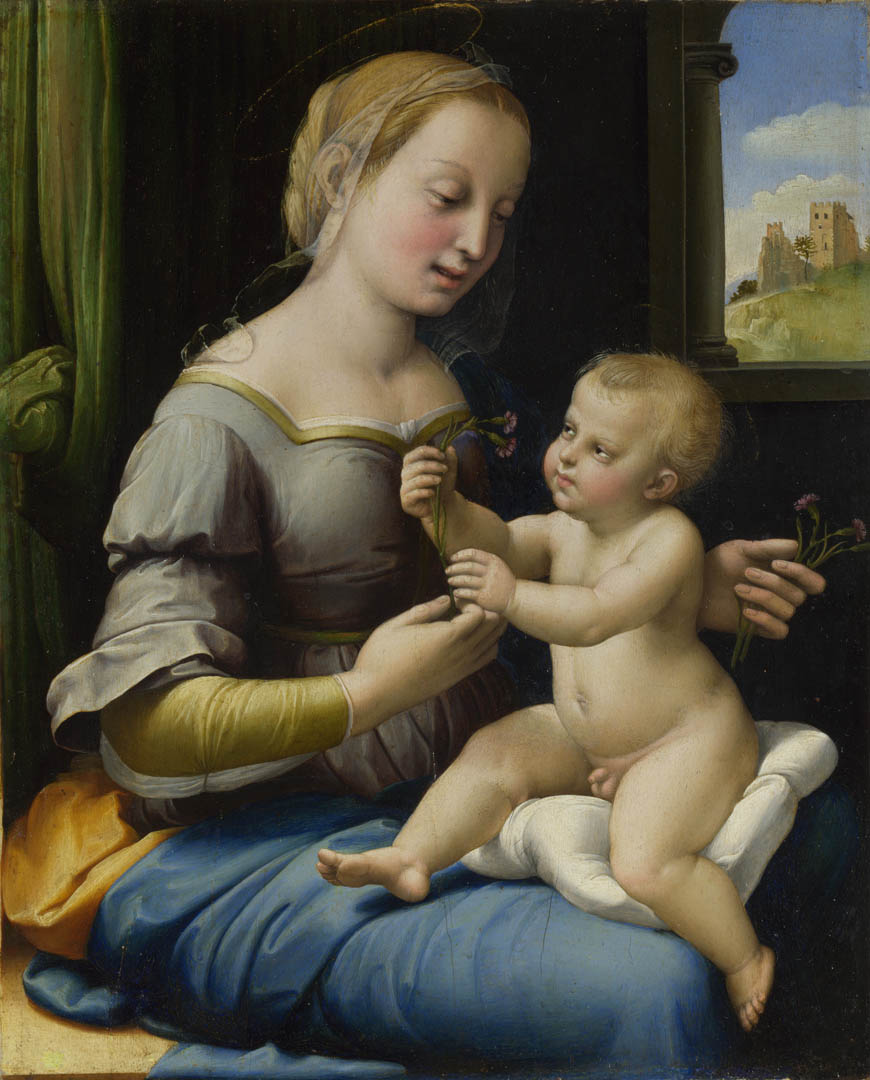
Raphael, The Madonna of the Pinks (La Madonna dei Garofani) (1506–07).

- American School
  - George Bellows – 1 painting
- Dutch School
  - Gerard ter Borch – 5 paintings;
  - Dirk Bouts – 9 paintings;
  - Aelbert Cuyp – 13 paintings;
  - Gerrit Dou – 3 paintings;
  - Vincent van Gogh – 7 paintings;
  - Jan van Goyen – 12 paintings;
  - Frans Hals – 8 painting;
  - Meyndert Hobbema – 9 paintings;
  - Pieter de Hooch – 5 paintings;
  - Gabriel Metsu – 6 paintings;
  - Aernout van der Neer – 9 paintings;
  - Adriaen van Ostade – 5 paintings;
  - Rembrandt – 27 paintings;
  - Salomon van Ruysdael – 6 paintings;
  - Jacob Isaakszoon van Ruisdael – 22 paintings;
  - Jan Steen – 11 paintings;
  - Adriaen van de Velde – 7 paintings;
  - Willem van de Velde the Younger – 18 paintings;
  - Johannes Vermeer – 2 paintings;
  - Jan Weenix – 2 paintings;
  - Philip Wouwerman – 12 paintings.
- English School
  - John Constable – 6 paintings;
  - Thomas Gainsborough – 11 paintings;
  - William Hogarth – 9 paintings;
  - John Hoppner – 1 painting;
  - Thomas Lawrence – 5 paintings;
  - Joshua Reynolds – 6 paintings;
  - George Stubbs – 3 paintings;
  - J. M. W. Turner – 10 paintings
  - Joseph Wright of Derby – 2 paintings.
- Flemish School
  - Jan Brueghel the Elder – 8 paintings;
  - Pieter Bruegel the Elder – 2 painting;
  - Petrus Christus – 2 paintings;
  - Anthony van Dyck – 25 paintings;
  - Jan van Eyck – 5 paintings;
  - Jan Mabuse – 9 paintings;
  - Quentin Matsys – 10 paintings;
  - Hans Memling – 10 paintings;
  - Peter Paul Rubens – 30 paintings;
  - David Teniers the Younger – 24 paintings.
- French School
  - François Boucher – 3 paintings;
  - Paul Cézanne – 11 paintings;
  - Philippe de Champaigne – 3 paintings;
  - Jean-Baptiste-Siméon Chardin – 4 paintings;
  - Jean-Baptiste-Camille Corot – 29 paintings;
  - Jacques-Louis David – 2 paintings;
  - Edgar Degas – 15 paintings;
  - Eugène Delacroix – 4 paintings;
  - Hippolyte Delaroche – 1 painting;
  - Gaspard Dughet – 8 paintings;
  - Jean-Honoré Fragonard – 2 paintings;
  - Paul Gauguin – 4 paintings;
  - Théodore Géricault – 2 paintings;
  - Jean-Baptiste Greuze – 5 paintings;
  - Jean Auguste Dominique Ingres – 6 paintings;
  - Claude Lorrain – 14 paintings;
  - Jean-Étienne Liotard – 2 paintings;
  - Édouard Manet – 5 paintings;
  - Claude Monet – 19 paintings;
  - Camille Pissarro – 11 paintings;
  - Nicolas Poussin – 15 paintings;
  - Pierre-Auguste Renoir – 13 paintings;
  - Théodore Rousseau – 6 paintings;
  - Georges-Pierre Seurat – 11 paintings;
  - Claude-Joseph Vernet – 7 paintings;
  - Horace Vernet – 6 paintings;
  - Jean-Antoine Watteau – 2 paintings.
- German School
  - Lucas Cranach the Elder – 11 paintings;
  - Albrecht Dürer – 3 paintings;
  - Hans Holbein the Younger – 4 paintings;
  - Johann Zoffany – 1 painting;
- Italian School
  - Fra Angelico – 9 paintings;
  - Jacopo Bassano – 5 paintings;
  - Giovanni Bellini – 15 paintings;
  - Moretto da Brescia – 12 paintings;
  - Bernardo Bellotto – 2 paintings;
  - Gian Lorenzo Bernini – 2 paintings;
  - Sandro Botticelli – 16 paintings;
  - Bronzino – 6 paintings;
  - Canaletto – 20 paintings;
  - Caravaggio – 3 paintings;
  - Annibale and Ludovico Carracci – 9 paintings;
  - Polidoro da Caravaggio – 1 painting;
  - Correggio – 13 paintings;
  - Carlo Crivelli – 27 paintings;
  - Bernardo Daddi – 1 painting;
  - Domenichino – 14 paintings;
  - Duccio di Buoninsegna – 5 paintings;
  - Artemisia Gentileschi - 1 painting;
  - Raffaellino del Garbo – 3 paintings;
  - Luca Giordano – 16 paintings;
  - Giotto di Bondone – 2 paintings;
  - Domenico Ghirlandaio – 5 paintings;
  - Francesco Guardi – 26 paintings;
  - Guercino – 9 paintings;
  - Leonardo da Vinci – 5 paintings;
  - Pietro Longhi – 5 paintings;
  - Lorenzo Lotto – 4 paintings;
  - Andrea Mantegna – 12 paintings;
  - Masaccio – 3 paintings;
  - Michelangelo – 4 paintings;
  - Giovanni Battista Moroni – 11 paintings;
  - Palma the Elder – 3 paintings;
  - Giovanni Paolo Pannini – 3 paintings;
  - Parmigianino – 5 paintings;
  - Piero della Francesca – 3 paintings;
  - Pietro Perugino – 8 paintings;
  - Francesco Pesellino – 9 paintings;
  - Raphael (Raffaello Sanzio) – 13 paintings;
  - Guido Reni – 12 paintings;
  - Sebastiano Ricci – 2 paintings;
  - Andrea del Sarto – 2 paintings;
  - Bernardo Strozzi – 3 paintings;
  - Giovanni Battista Tiepolo – 11 paintings;
  - Tintoretto – 3 paintings;
  - Titian – 21 paintings;
  - Paolo Uccello – 2 paintings;
  - Paolo Veronese – 11 paintings;
  - Francesco Zuccarelli – 1 painting.
- Spanish School
  - Francisco Goya – 5 paintings;
  - Bartolomé Esteban Murillo – 10 paintings;
  - Pablo Picasso – 2 paintings;
  - Diego Velázquez – 10 paintings;
  - Francisco de Zurbarán – 4 paintings.

== Galleries ==
=== Paintings ===
Dutch Paintings

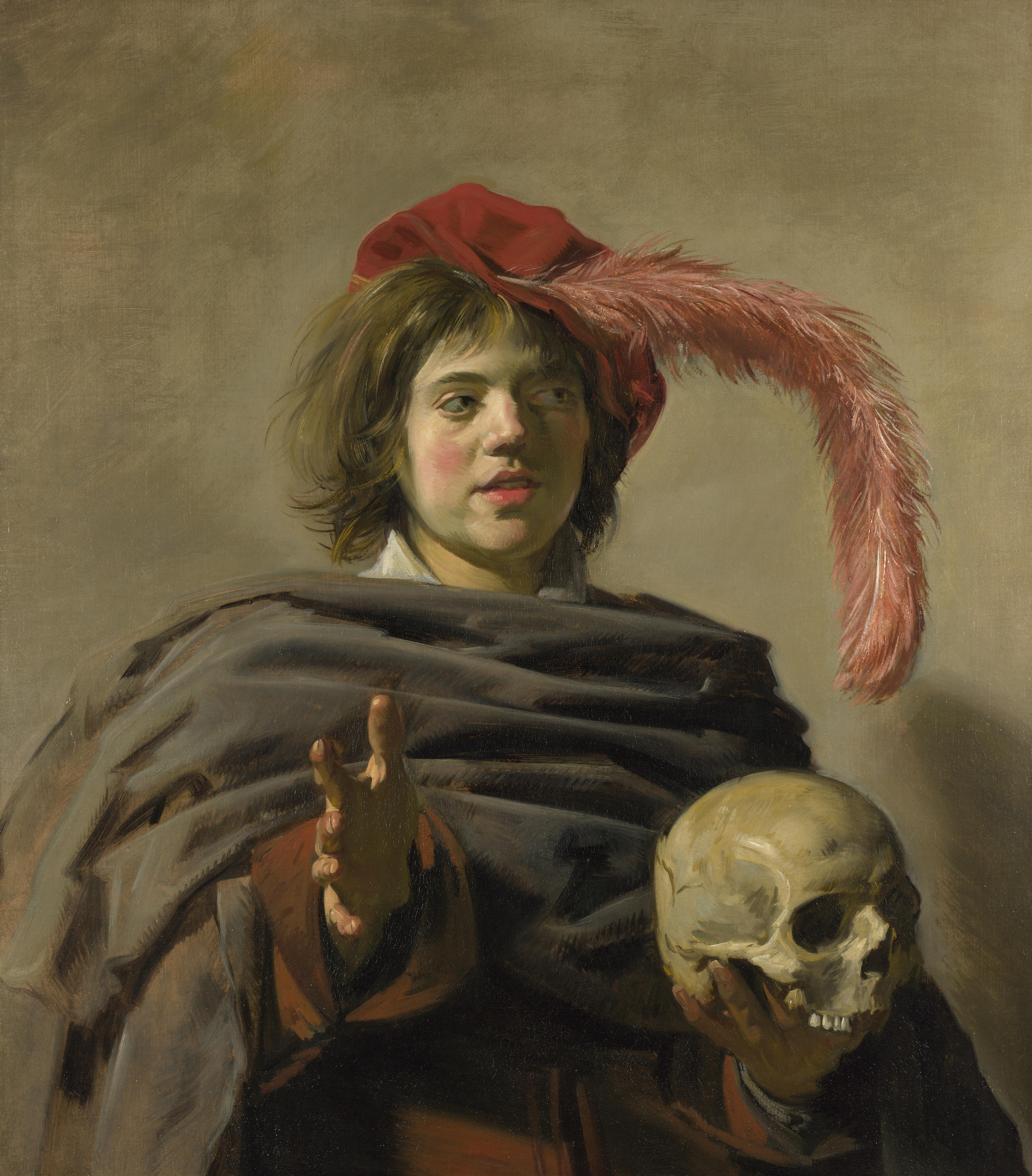
Frans Hals, Young Man with a Skull c. (1626–28)

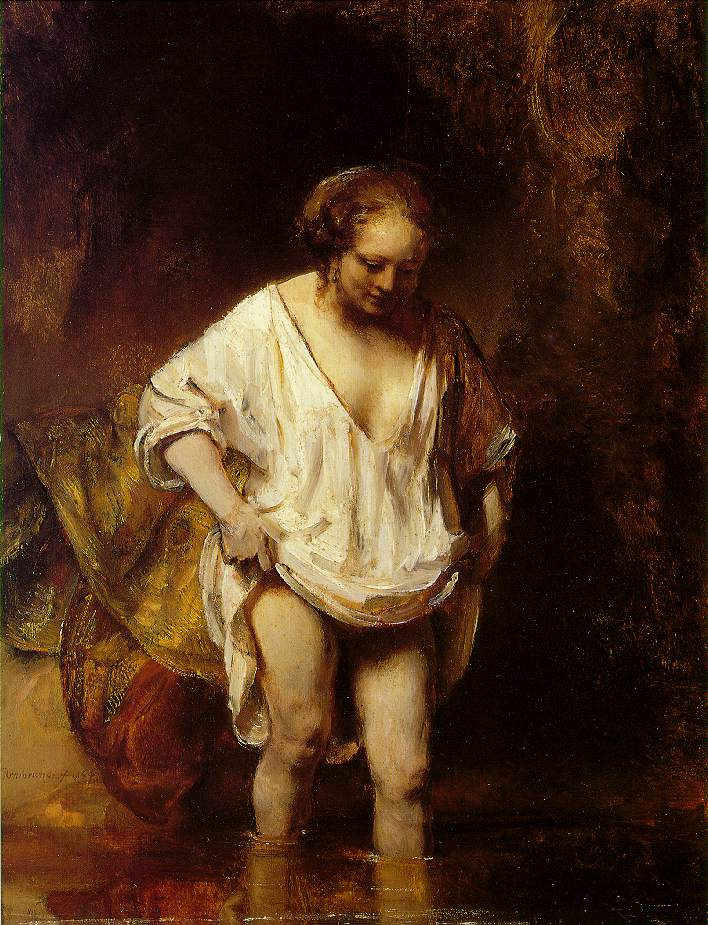
Rembrandt, A Woman Bathing in a Stream, (1655)

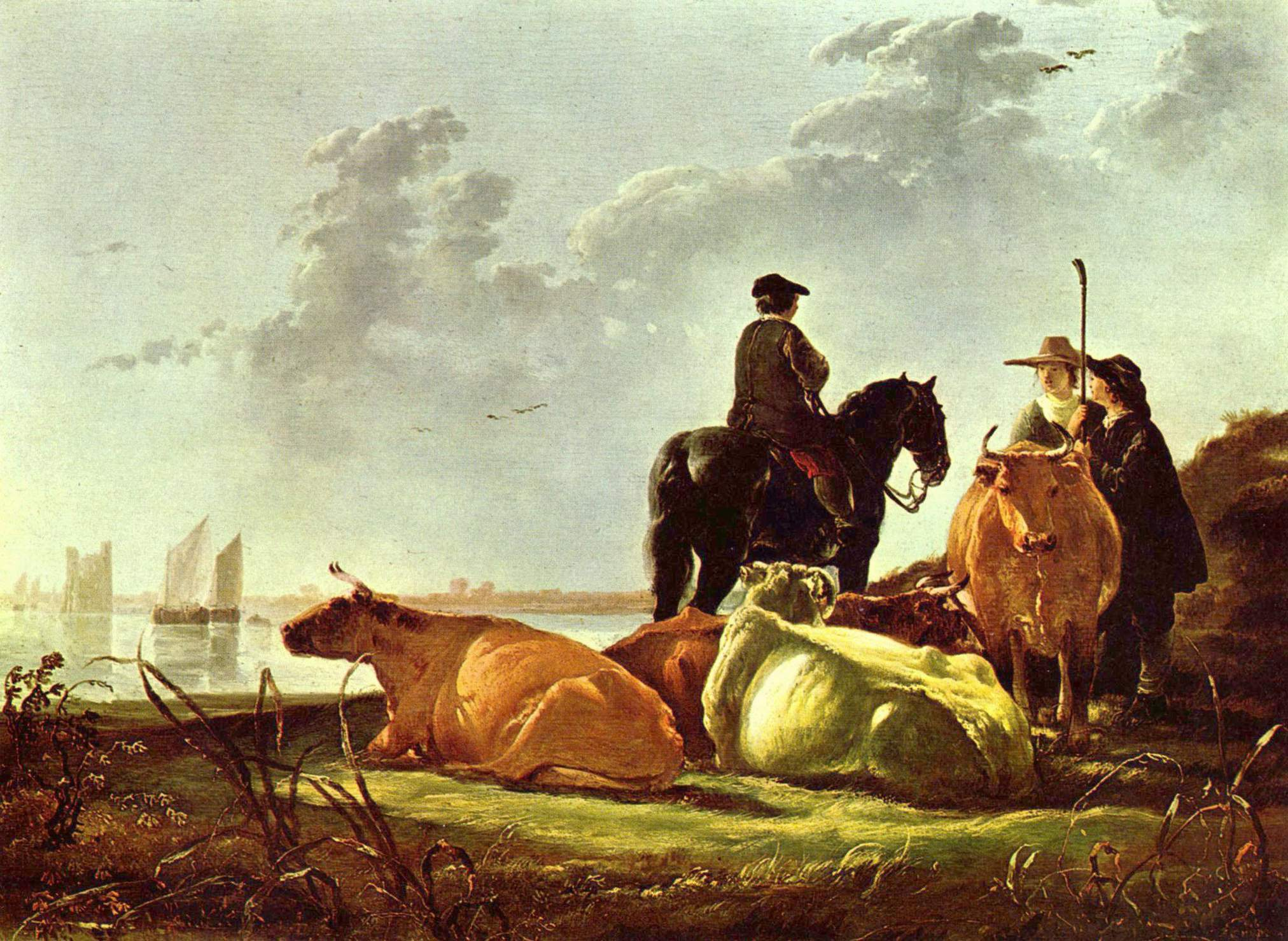
Aelbert Cuyp - Peasants and Cattle by the River Merwede (1658–60)

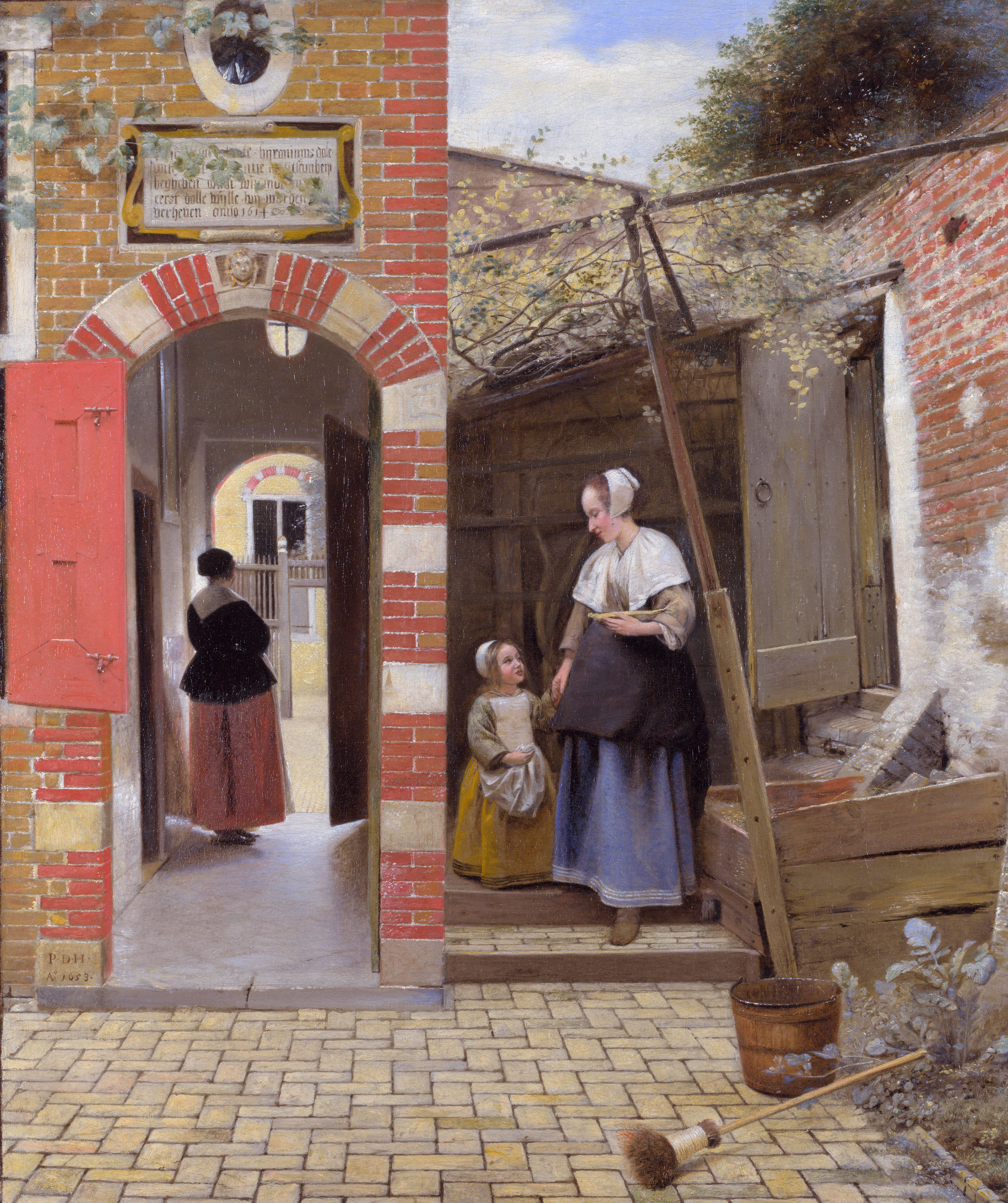
Pieter de Hooch - The Courtyard of a House in Delft (1658)

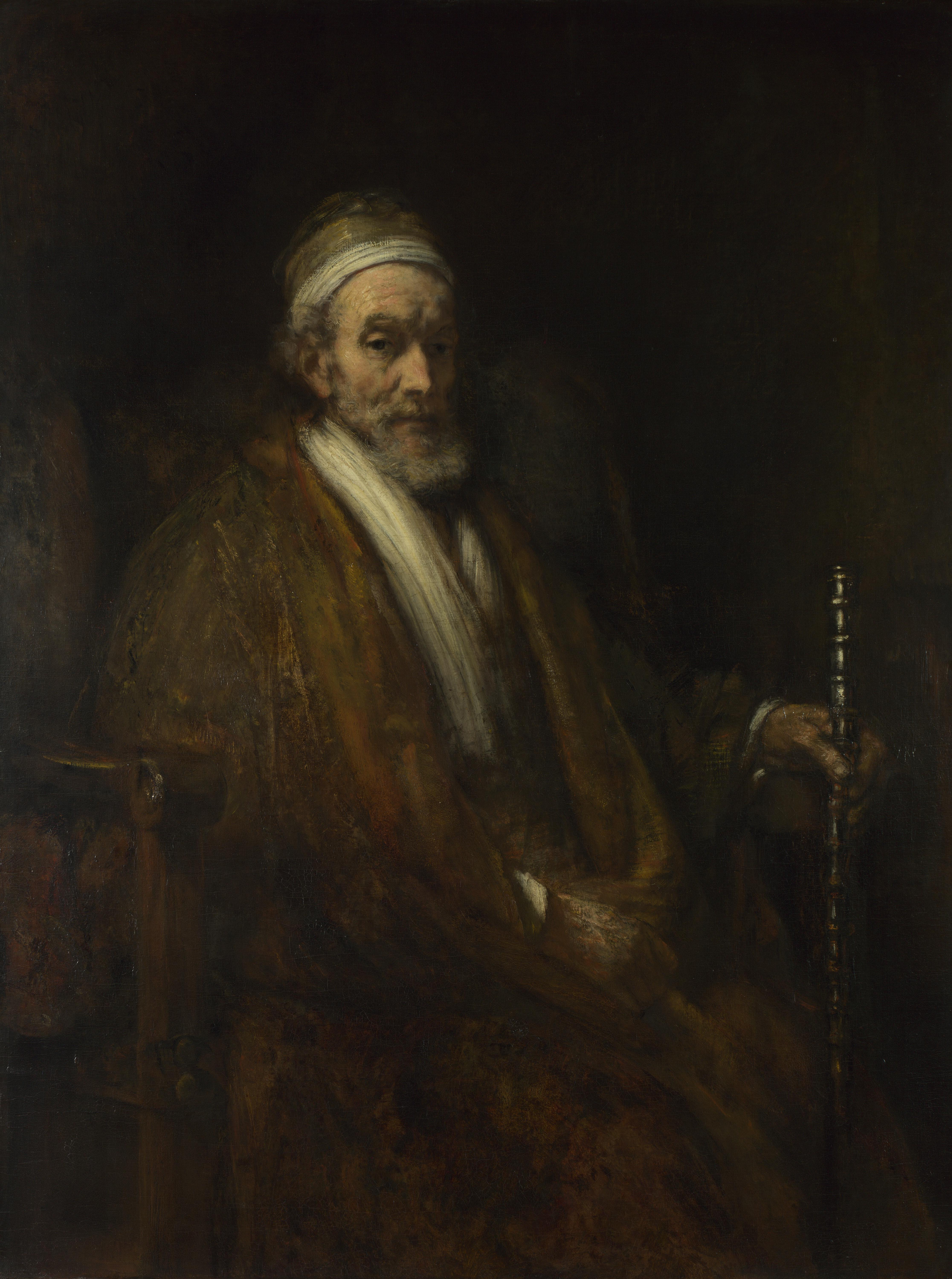
Rembrandt, Portrait of Jacob Trip, (1661)

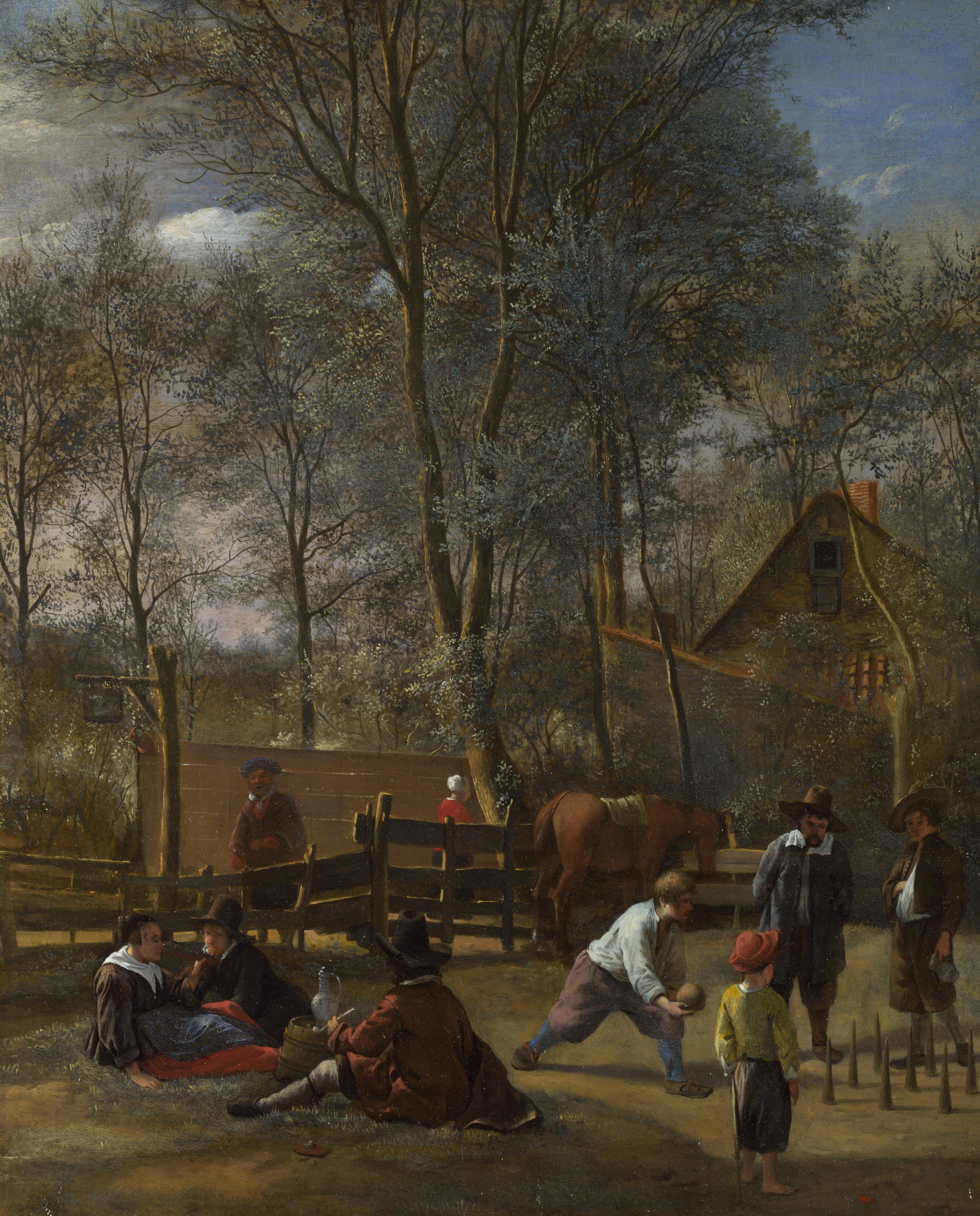
Jan Steen - Skittle Players outside an Inn (1660-3)

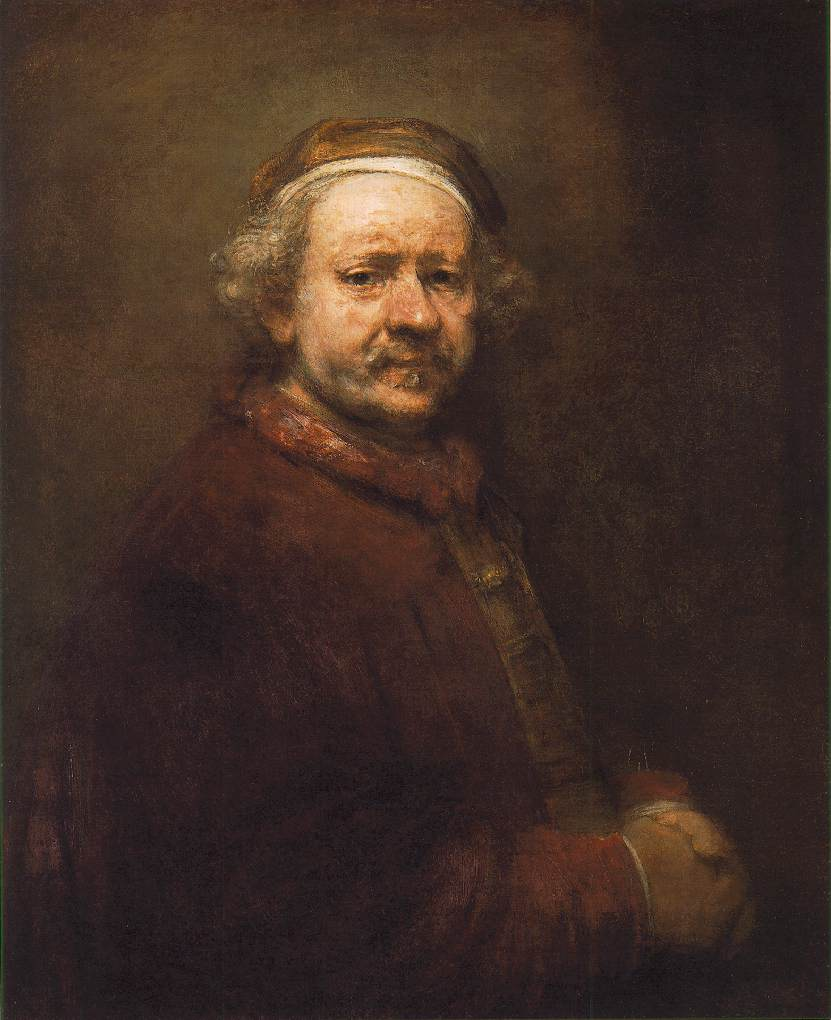
Rembrandt, Self-Portrait, (1669)

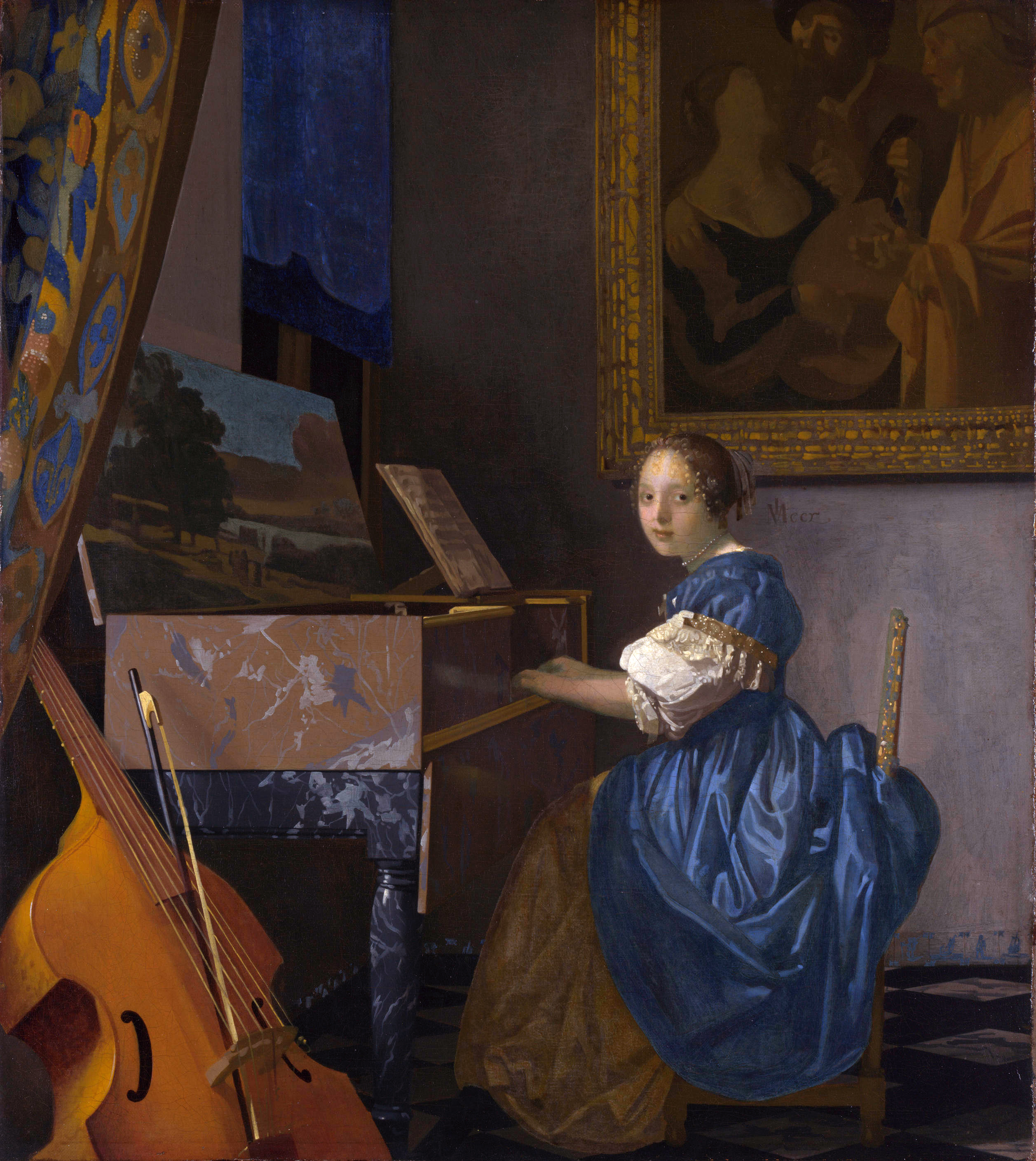
Johannes Vermeer - Lady Seated at a Virginal (1670-2)

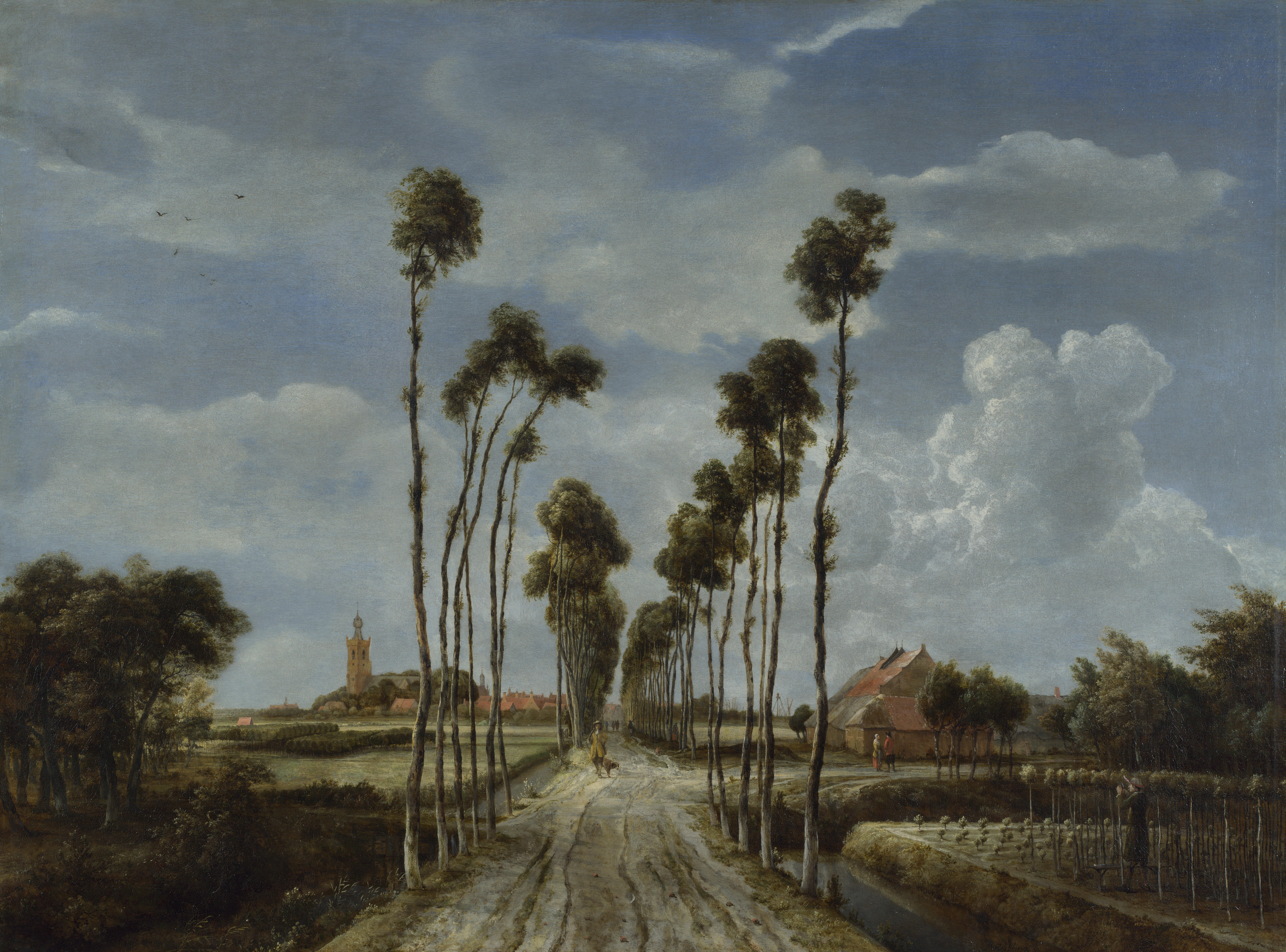
Meindert Hobbema - The Avenue at Middelharnis(1689)

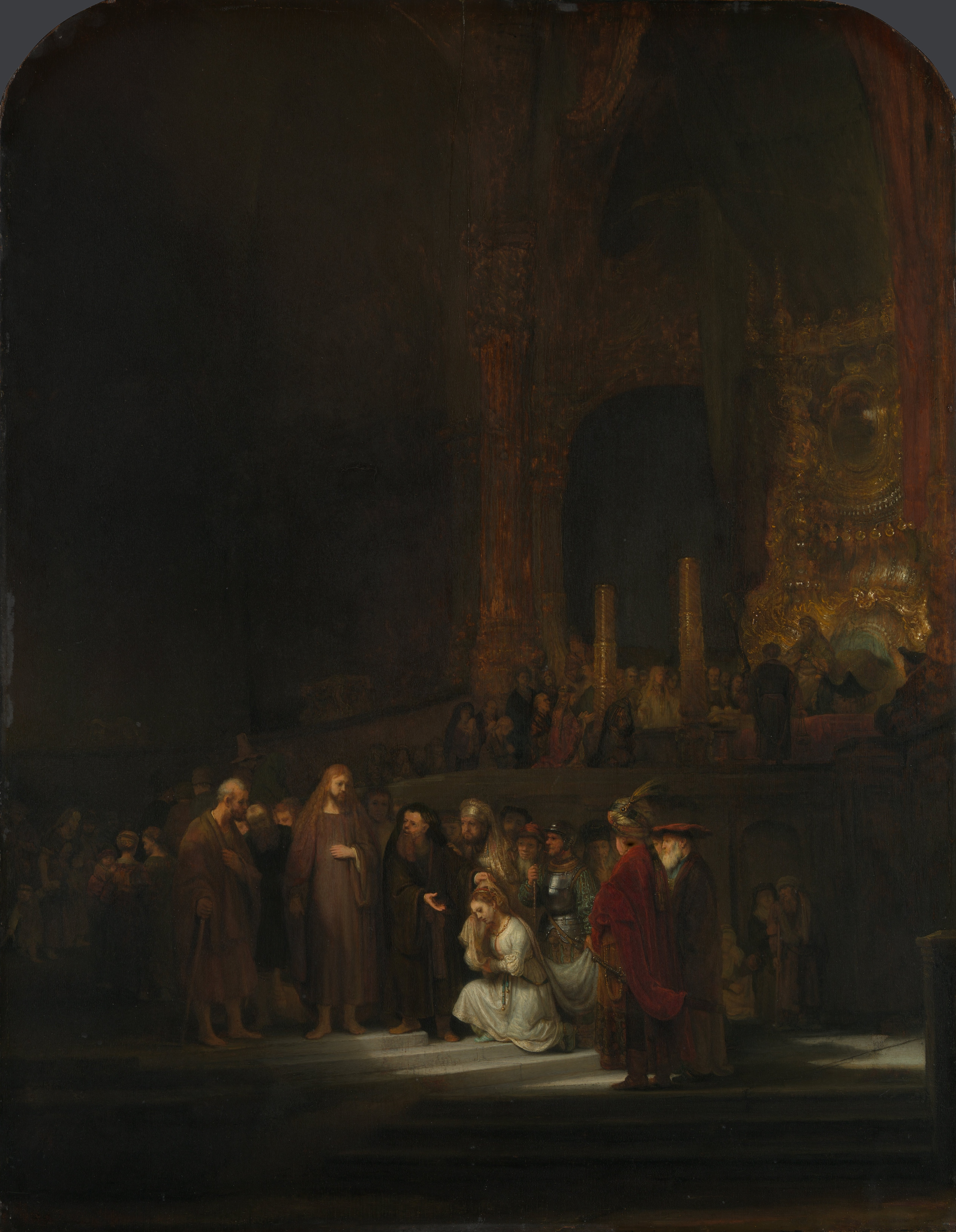
Rembrandt, The Woman taken in Adultery, 1644

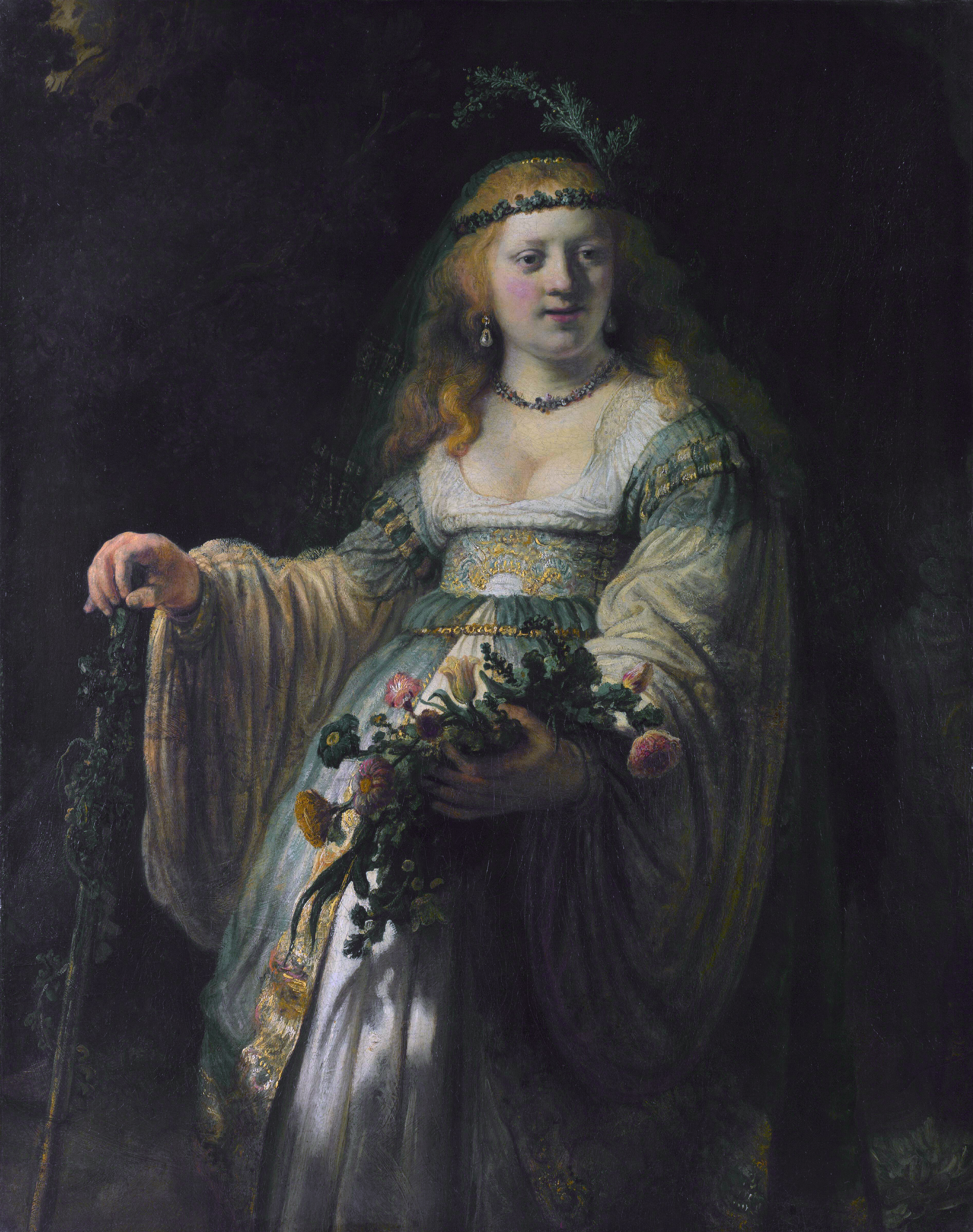
Rembrandt, Saskia van Uylenburgh in Arcadian Costume, 1635

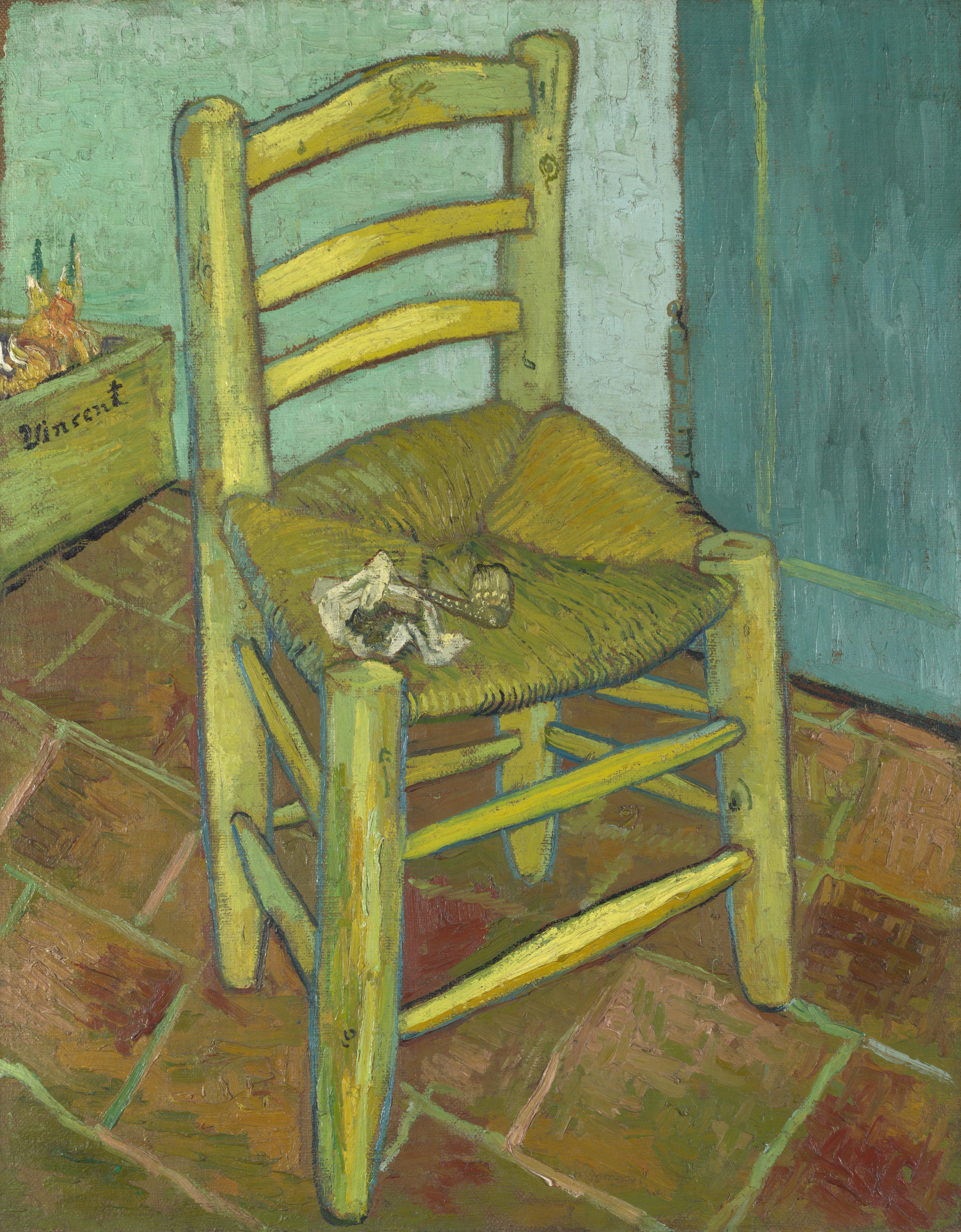
Vincent van Gogh, Van Gogh's Chair, 1888

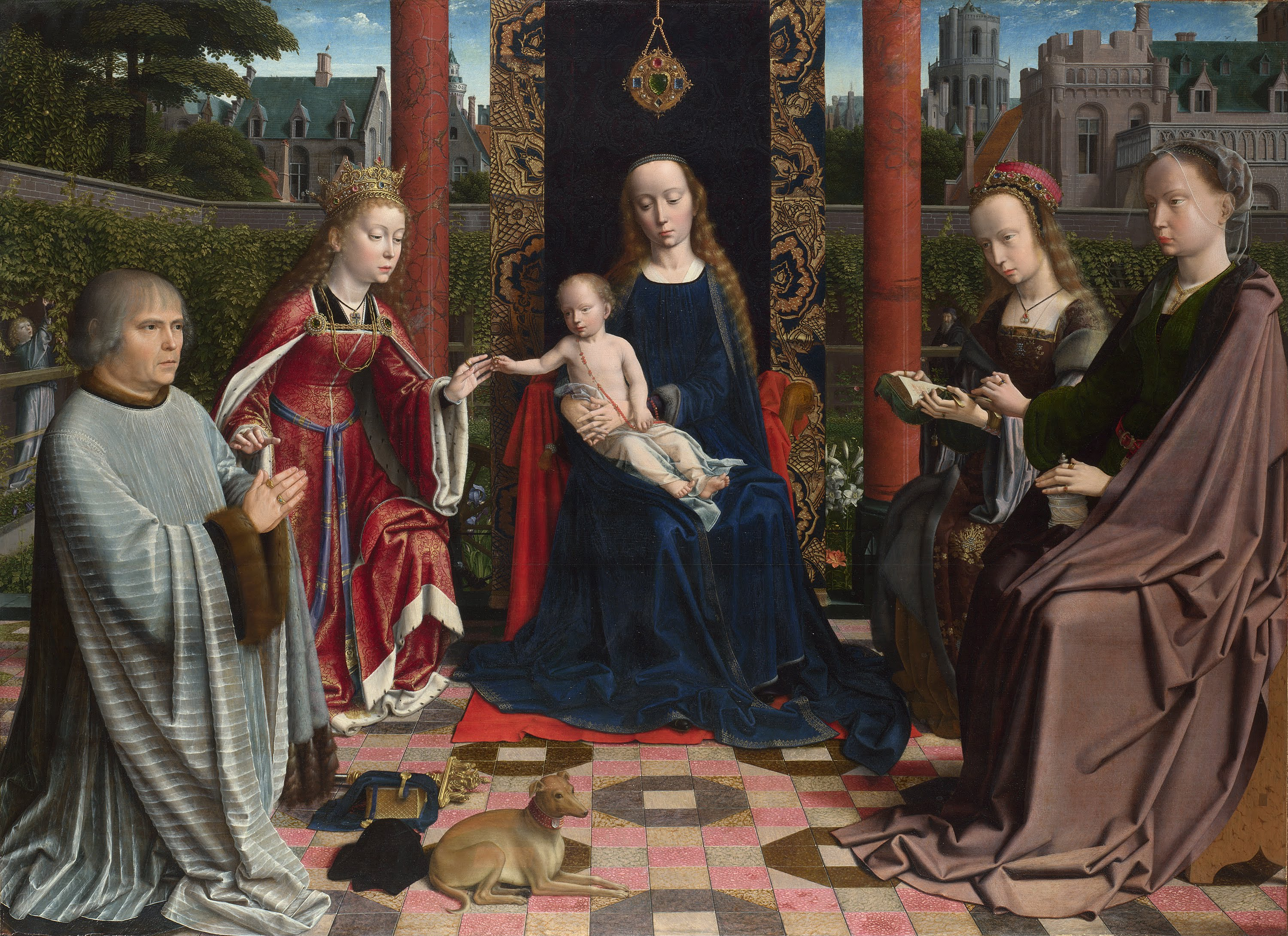
Gerard David, The Virgin and Child with Saints and a Donor, probably 1510

English Paintings

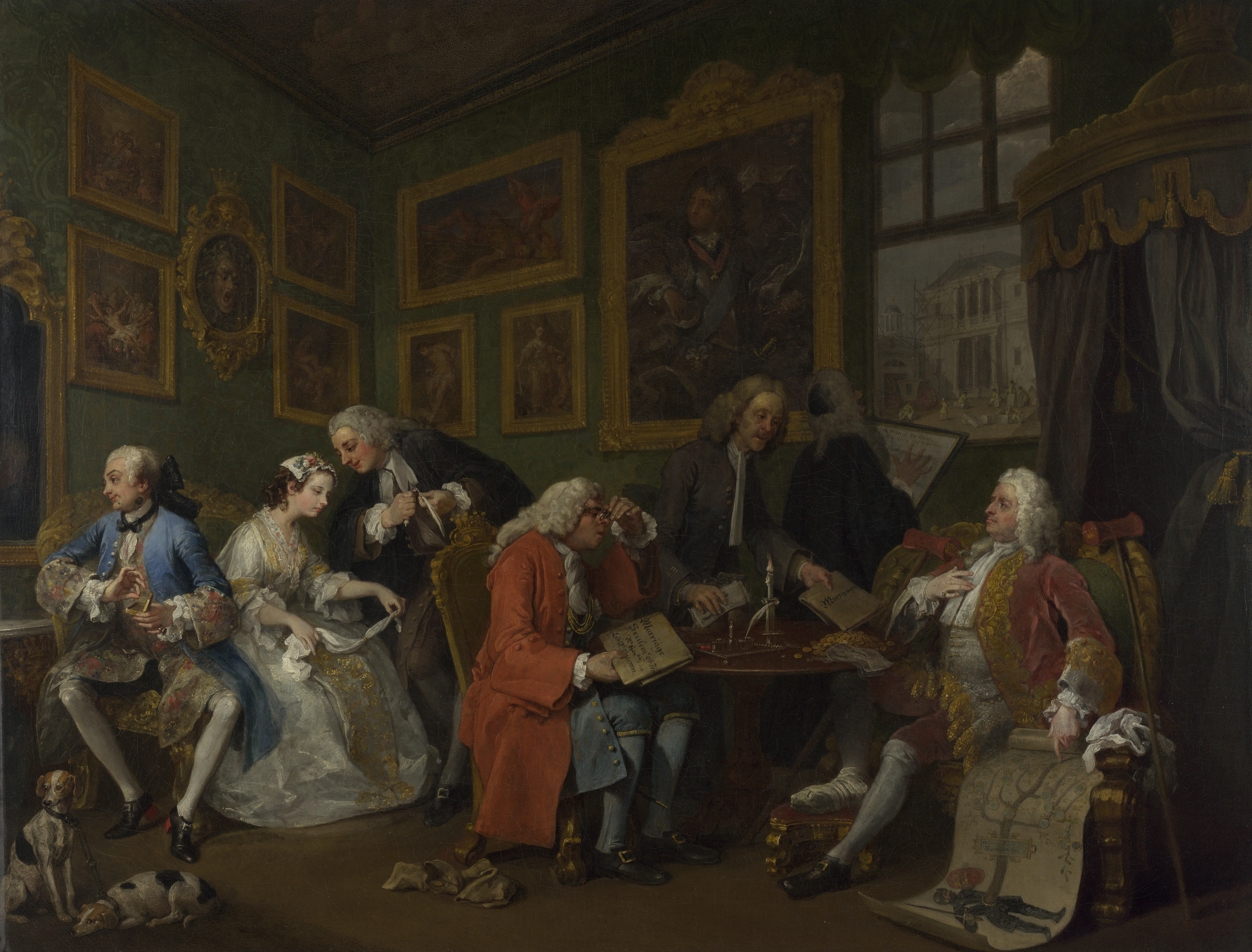
William Hogarth - Marriage à-la-mode (1743)

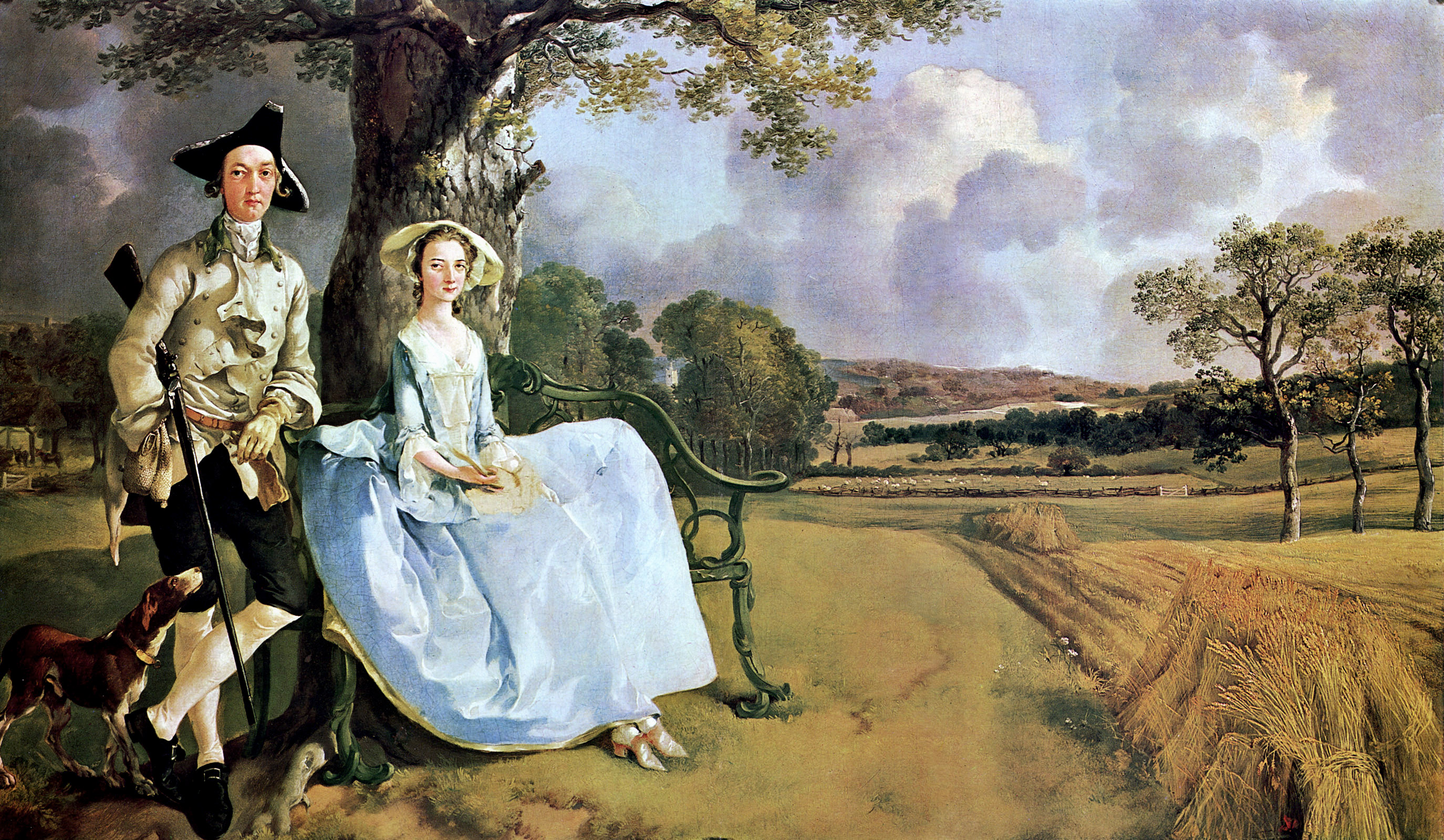
Thomas Gainsborough - Mr and Mrs Andrews (1750)

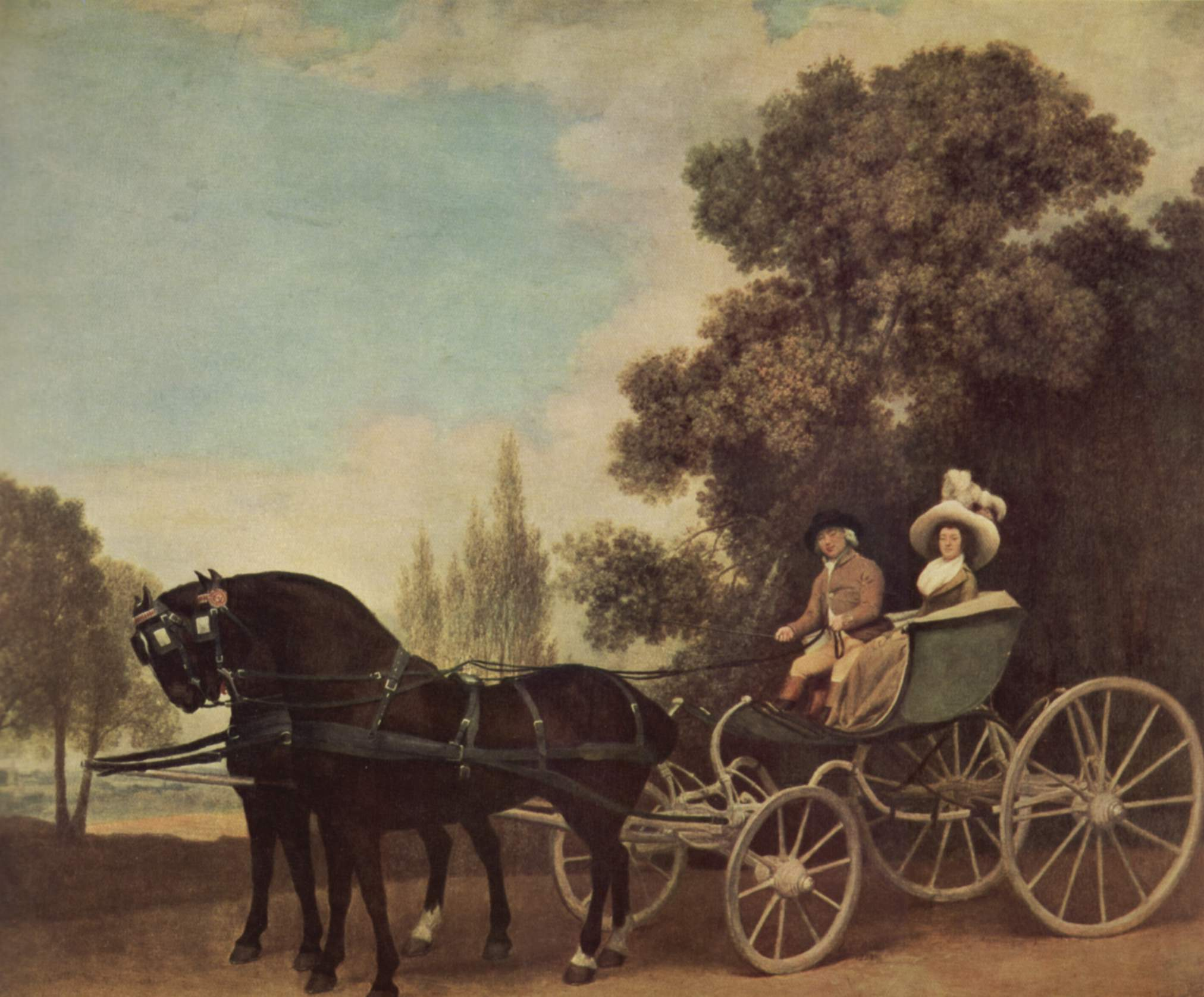
George Stubbs, Lady and Gentleman in a Carriage, (1787)

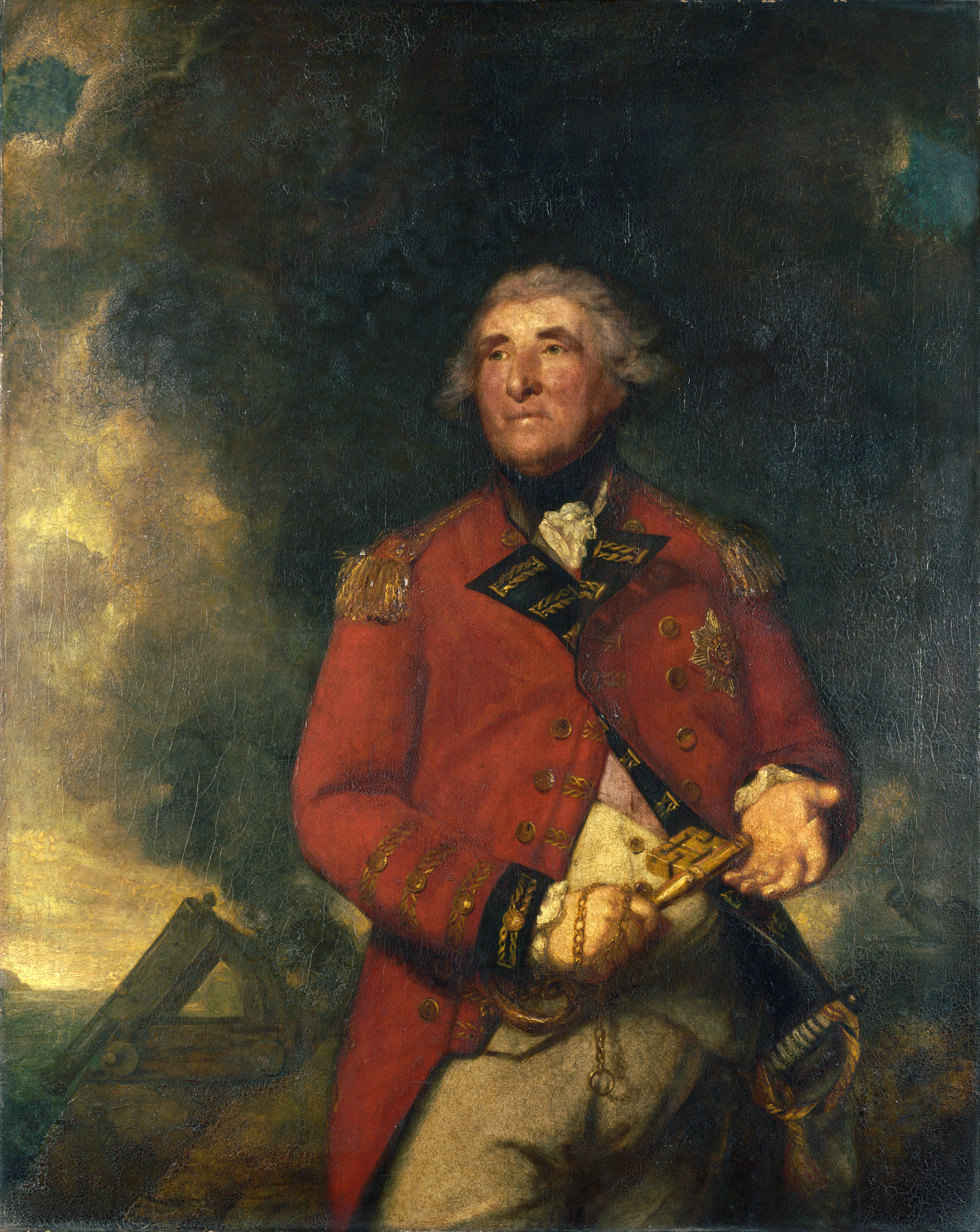
Joshua Reynolds, Lord Heathfield (1788)

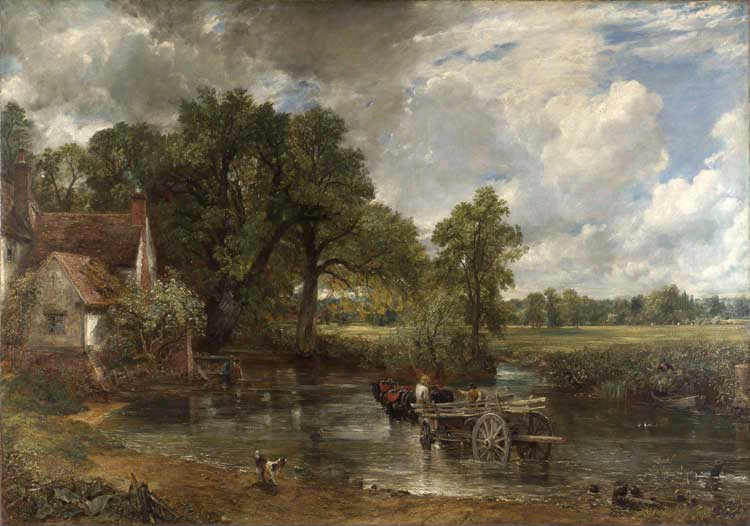
John Constable - The Hay Wain (1821)

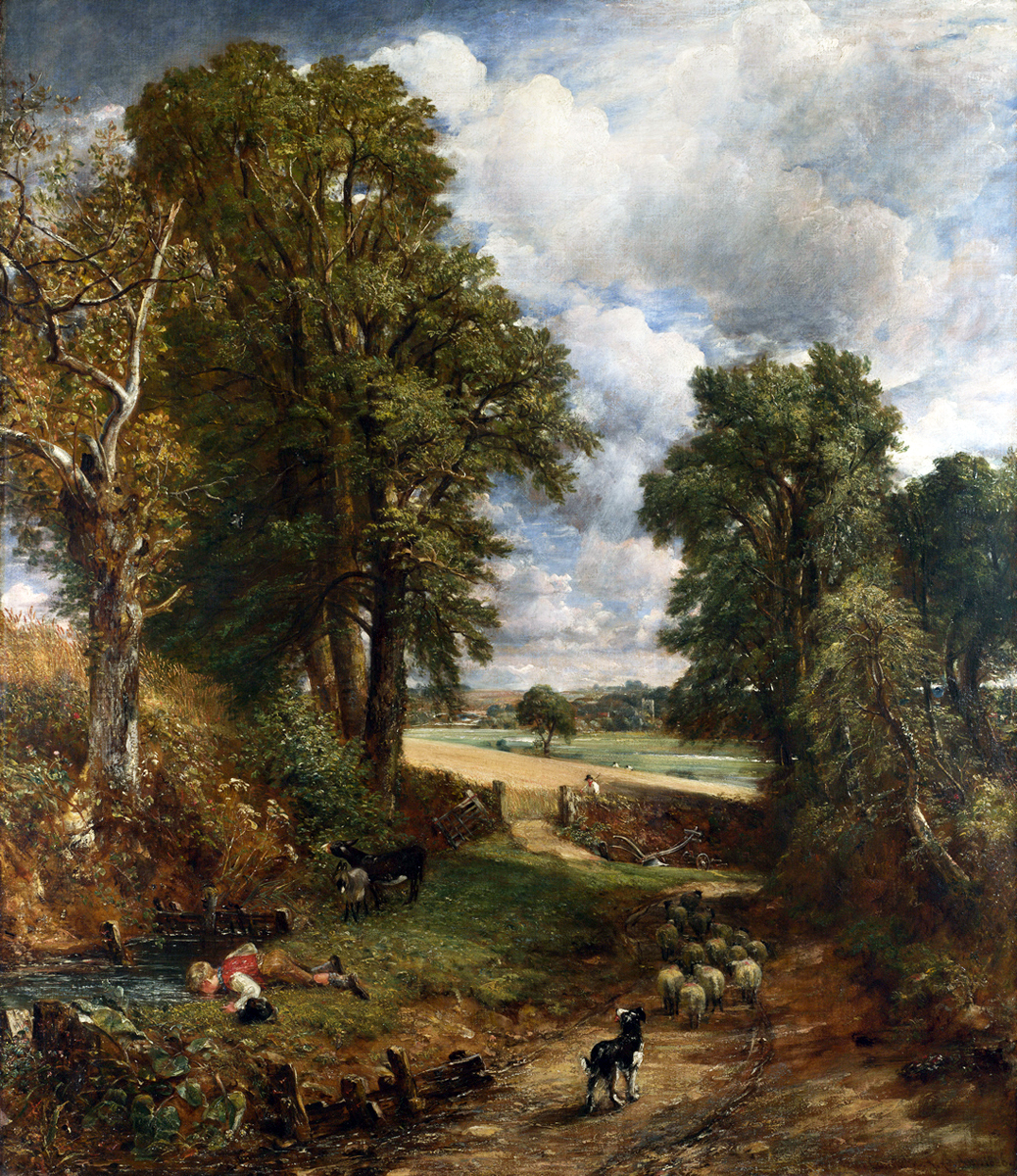
John Constable - The Cornfield (1826)

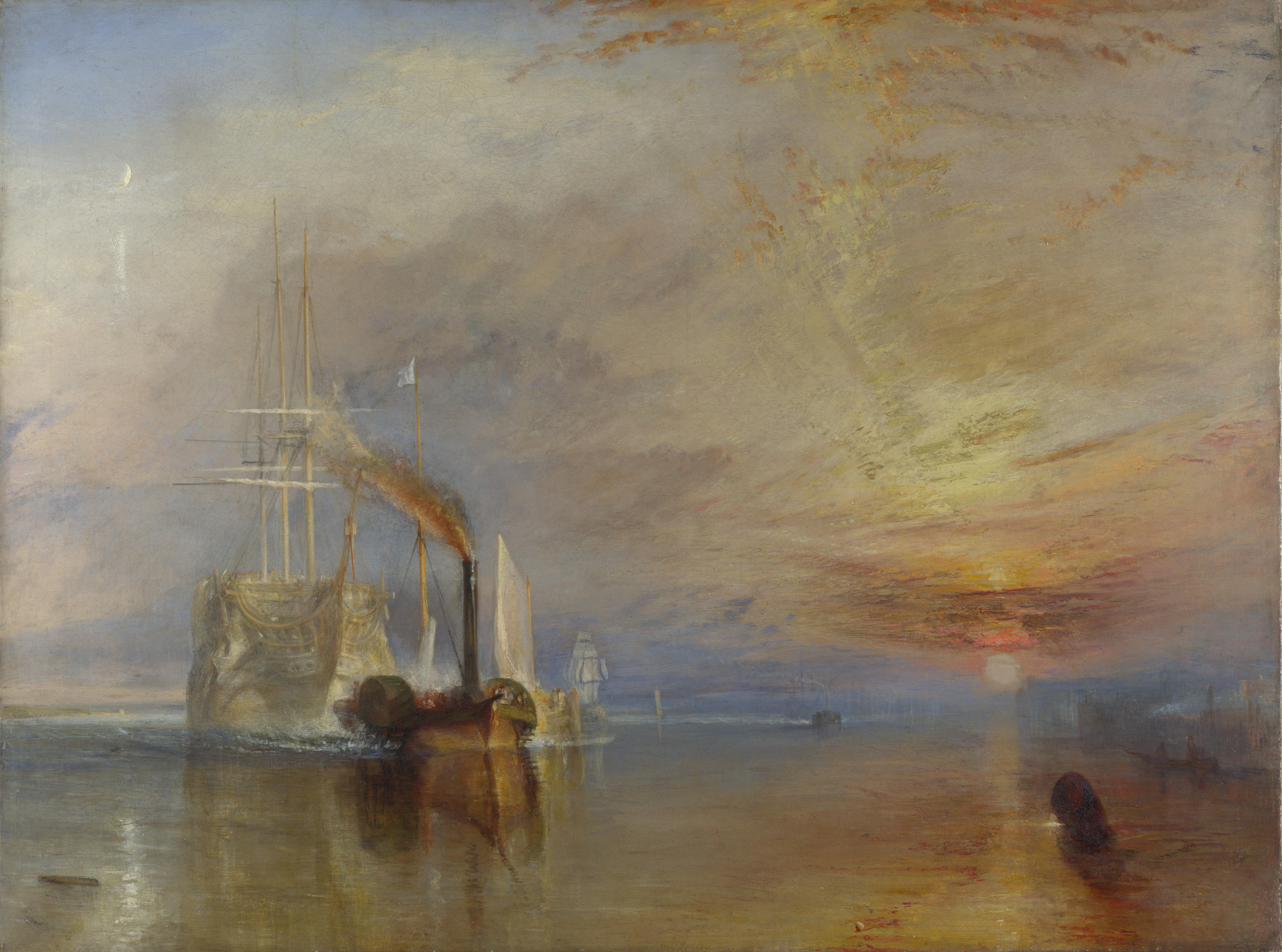
J. M. W. Turner - The Fighting Temeraire (1839)

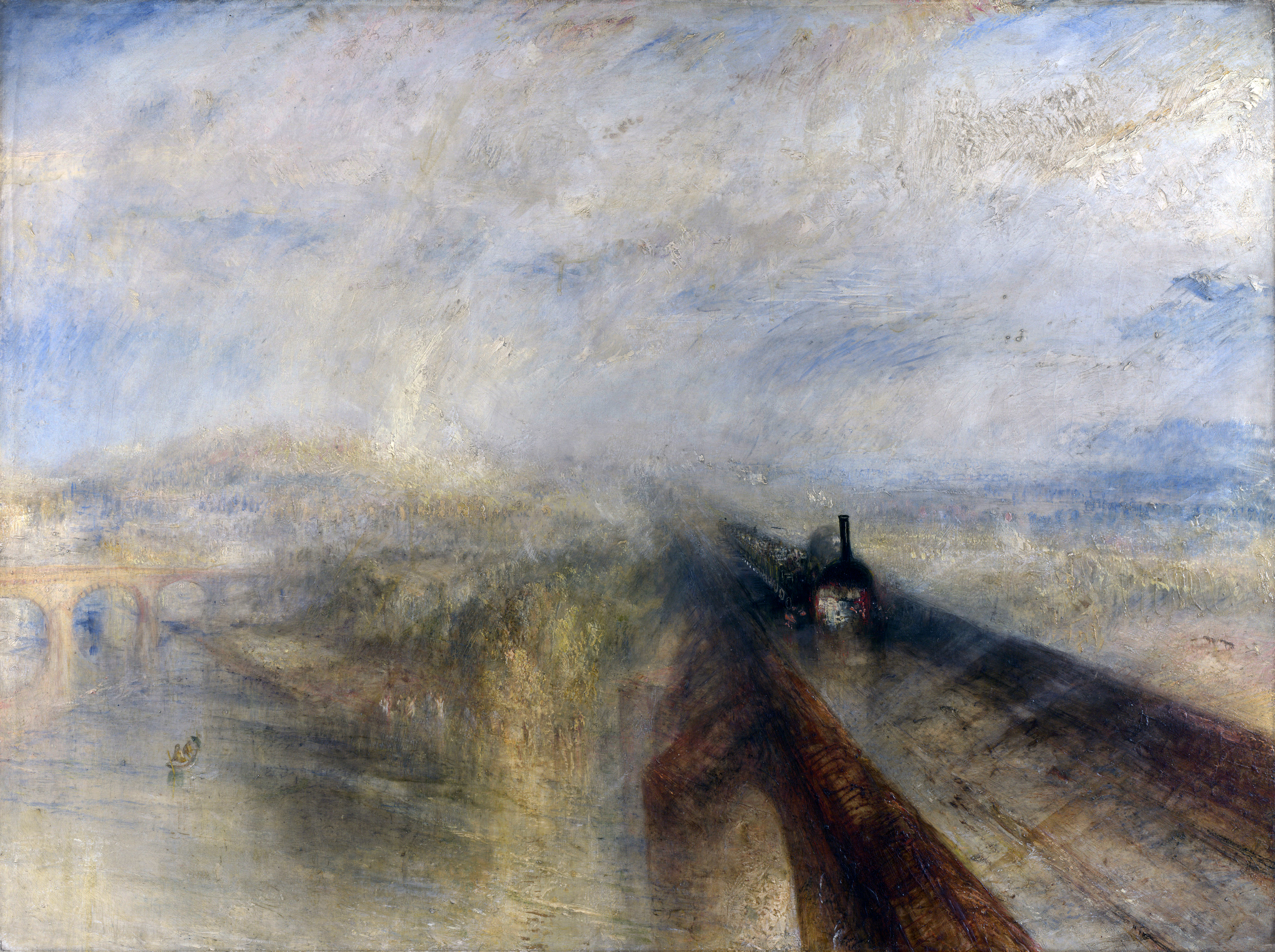
J. M. W. Turner - Rain, Steam and Speed - The Great Western Railway (1844)

Flemish Paintings

Jan van Eyck - Portrait of a Man (Self Portrait?) (1433)

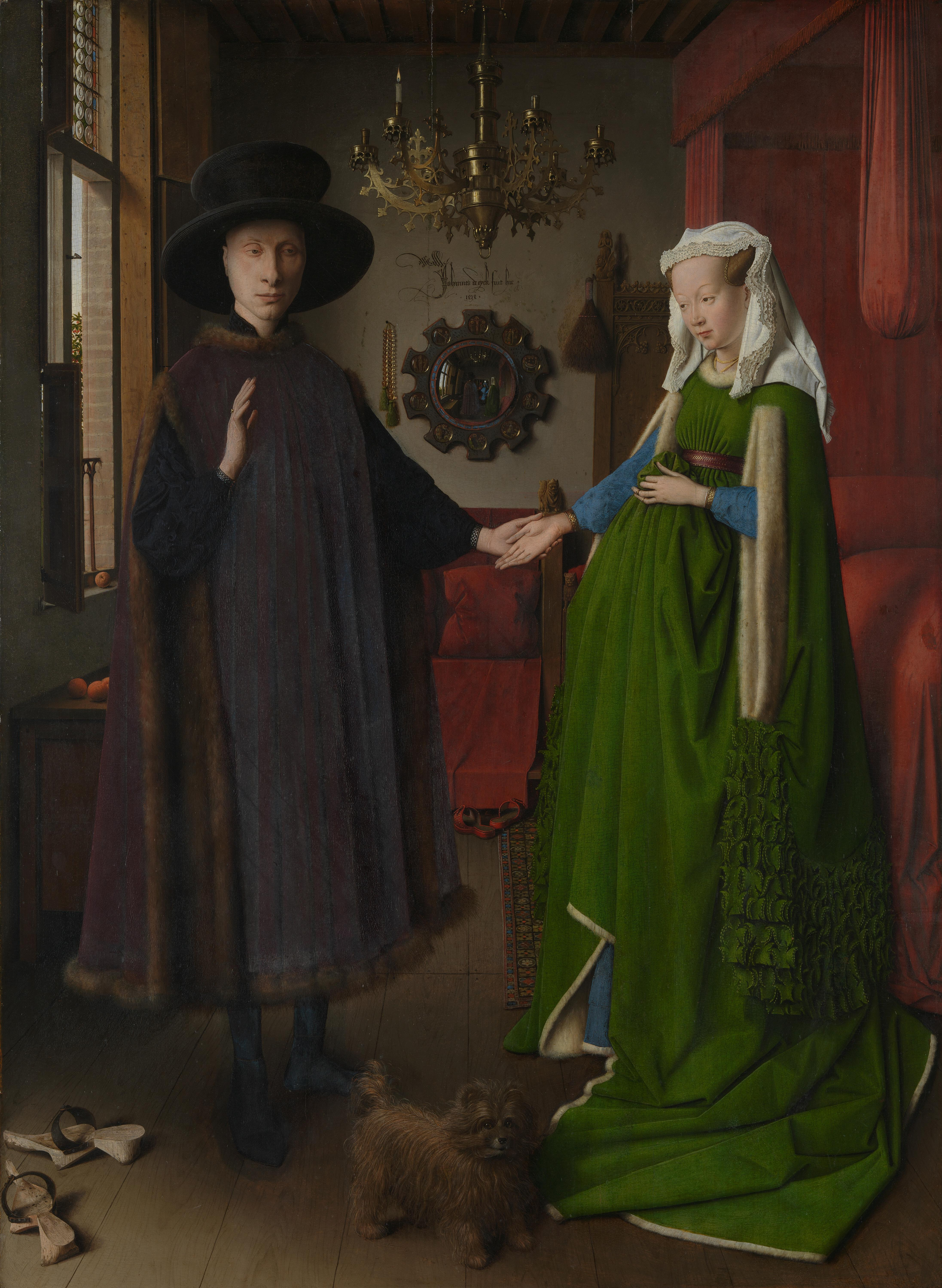
Jan van Eyck - The Arnolfini Portrait (1434)

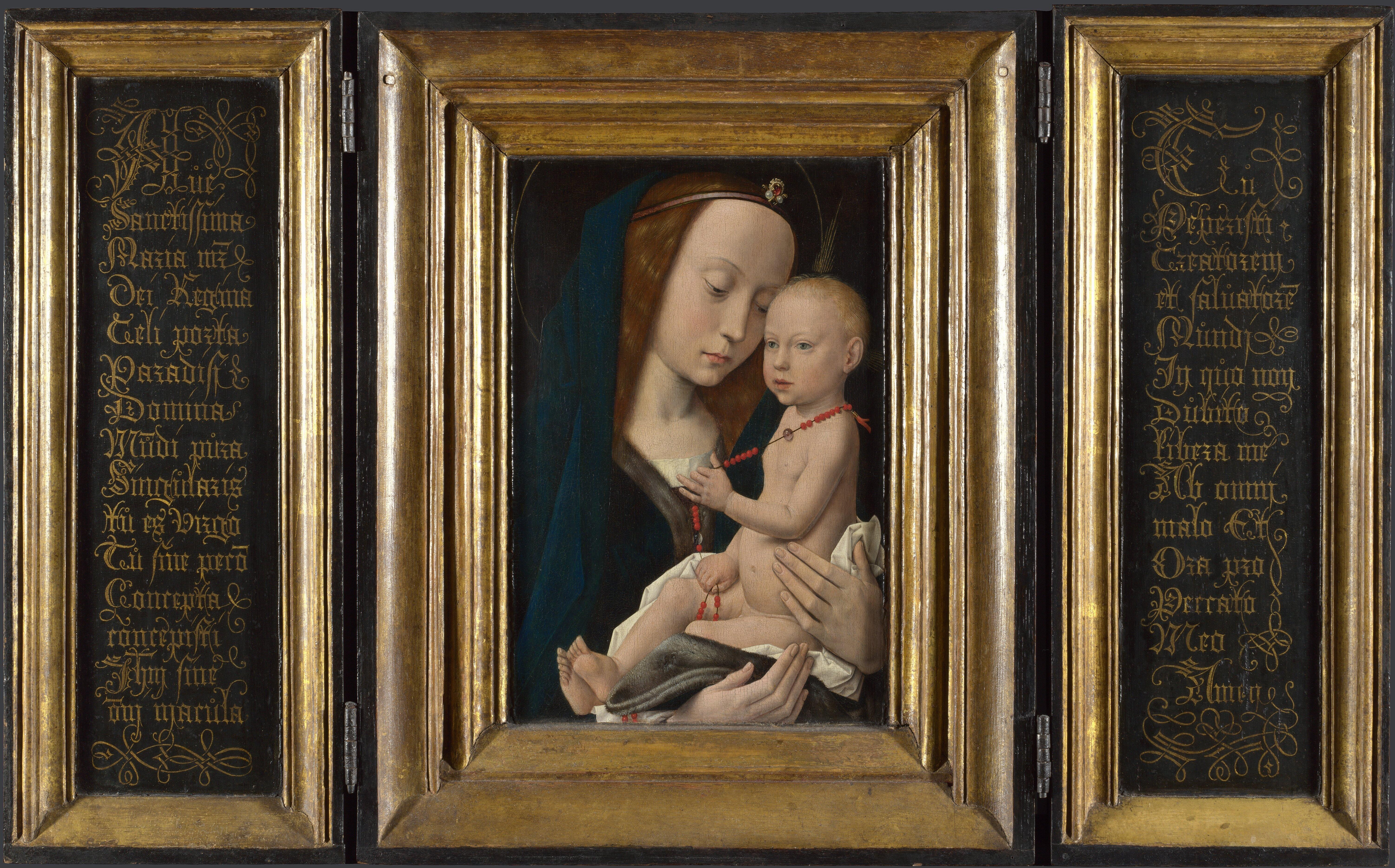
Follower of Hugo van der Goes - Virgin and Child, c. (1485)

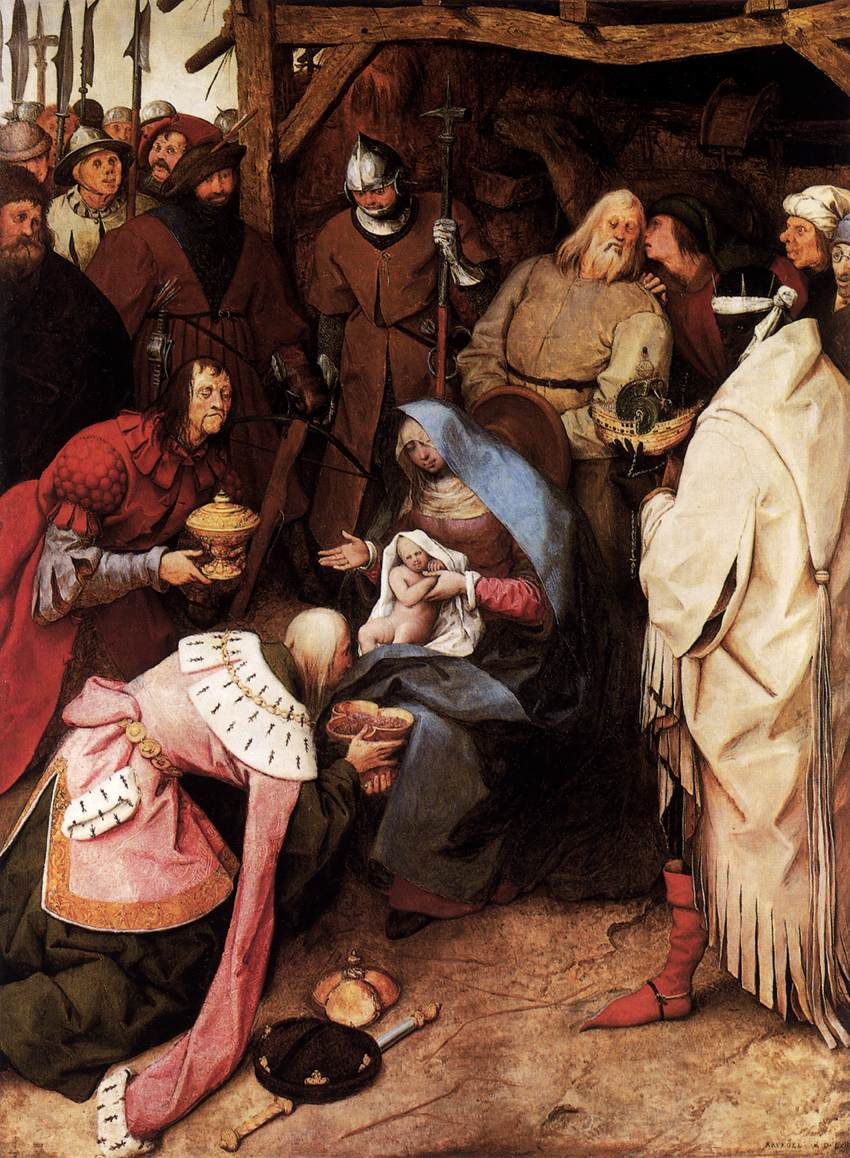
Pieter Bruegel the Elder, The Adoration of the Kings, (1564)

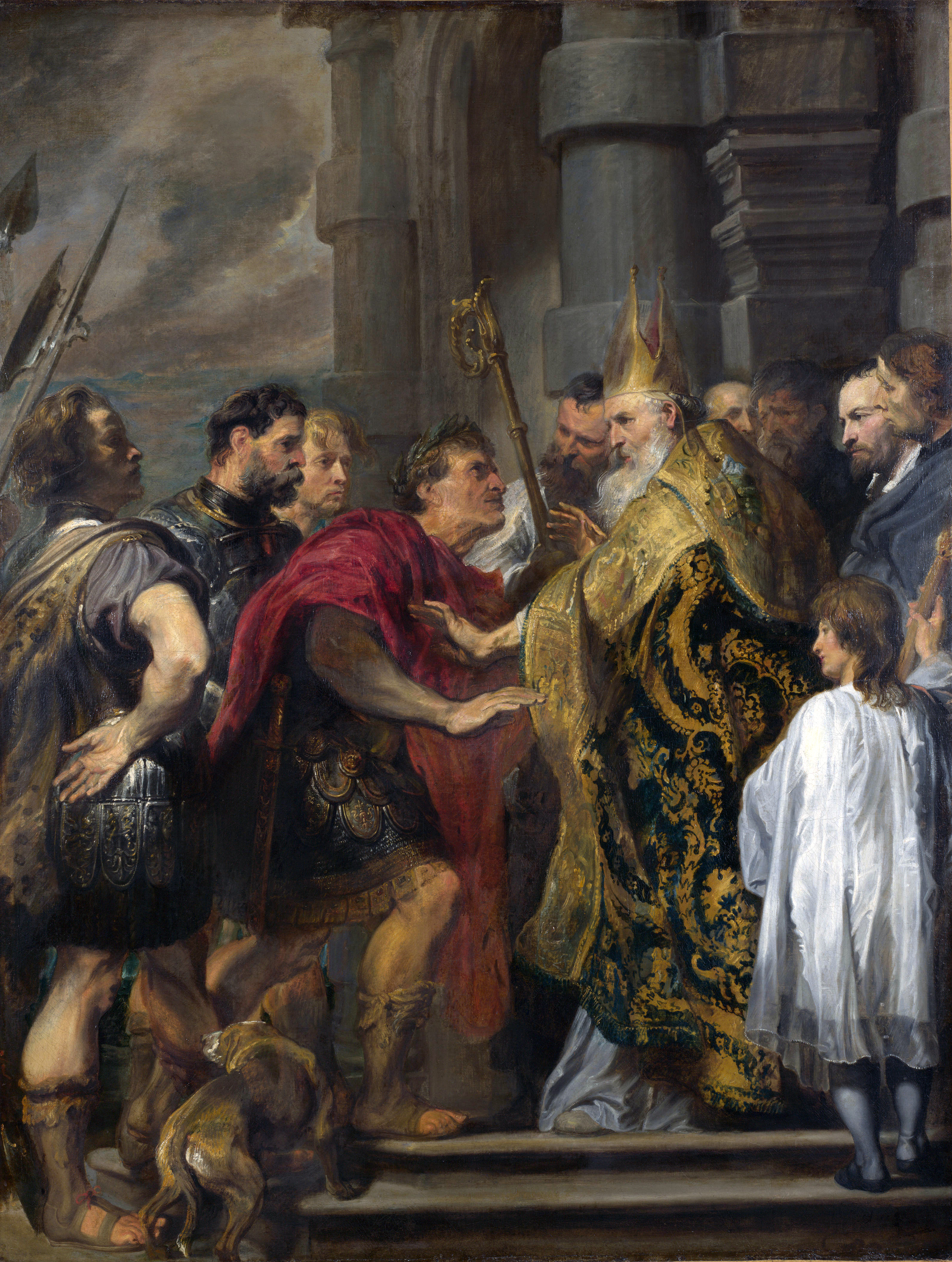
Anthony van Dyck - The Emperor Theodosius is Forbidden by Saint Ambrose to enter Milan Cathedral, (1619–20)

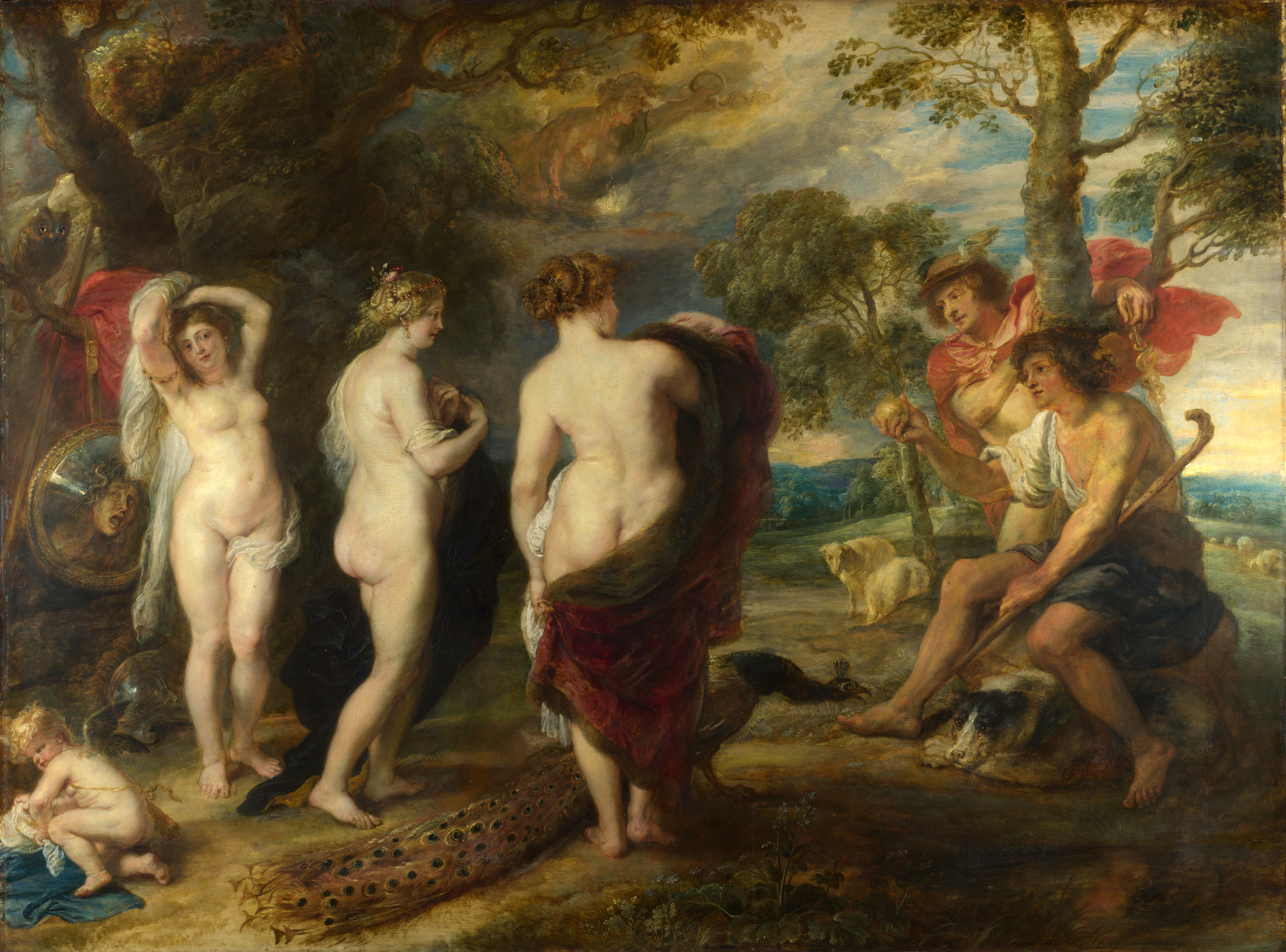
Peter Paul Rubens - The Judgement of Paris (1632-5)

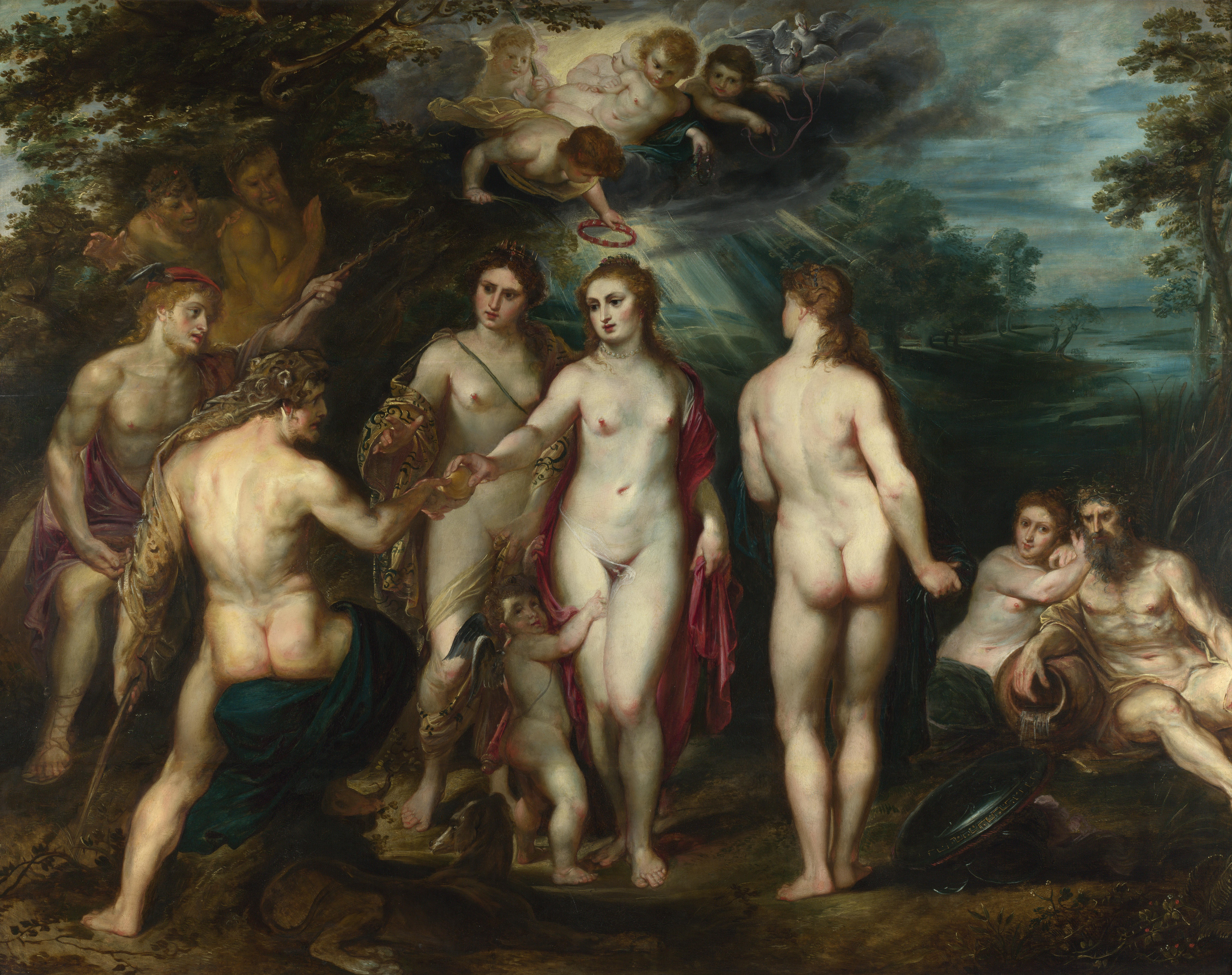
Peter Paul Rubens - The Judgement of Paris (1632-5)

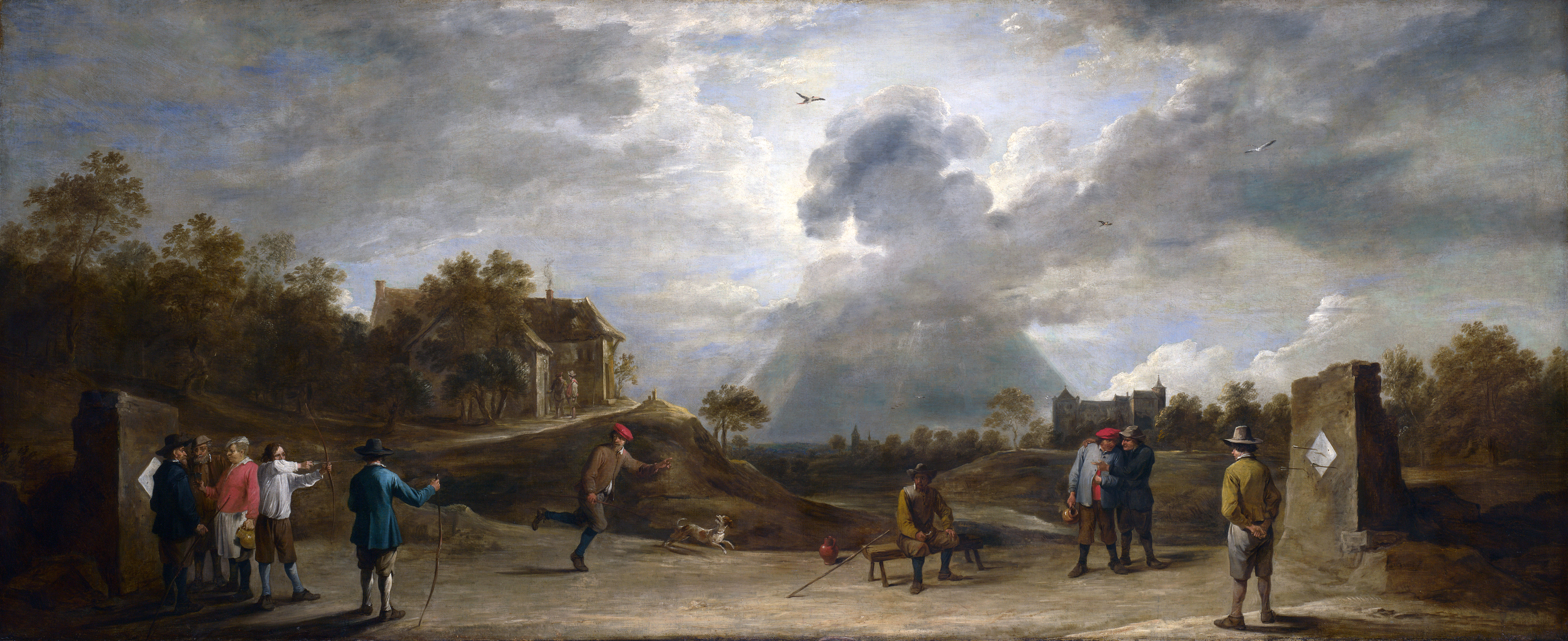
David Teniers the Younger - Peasants at Archery (1645)

French Paintings

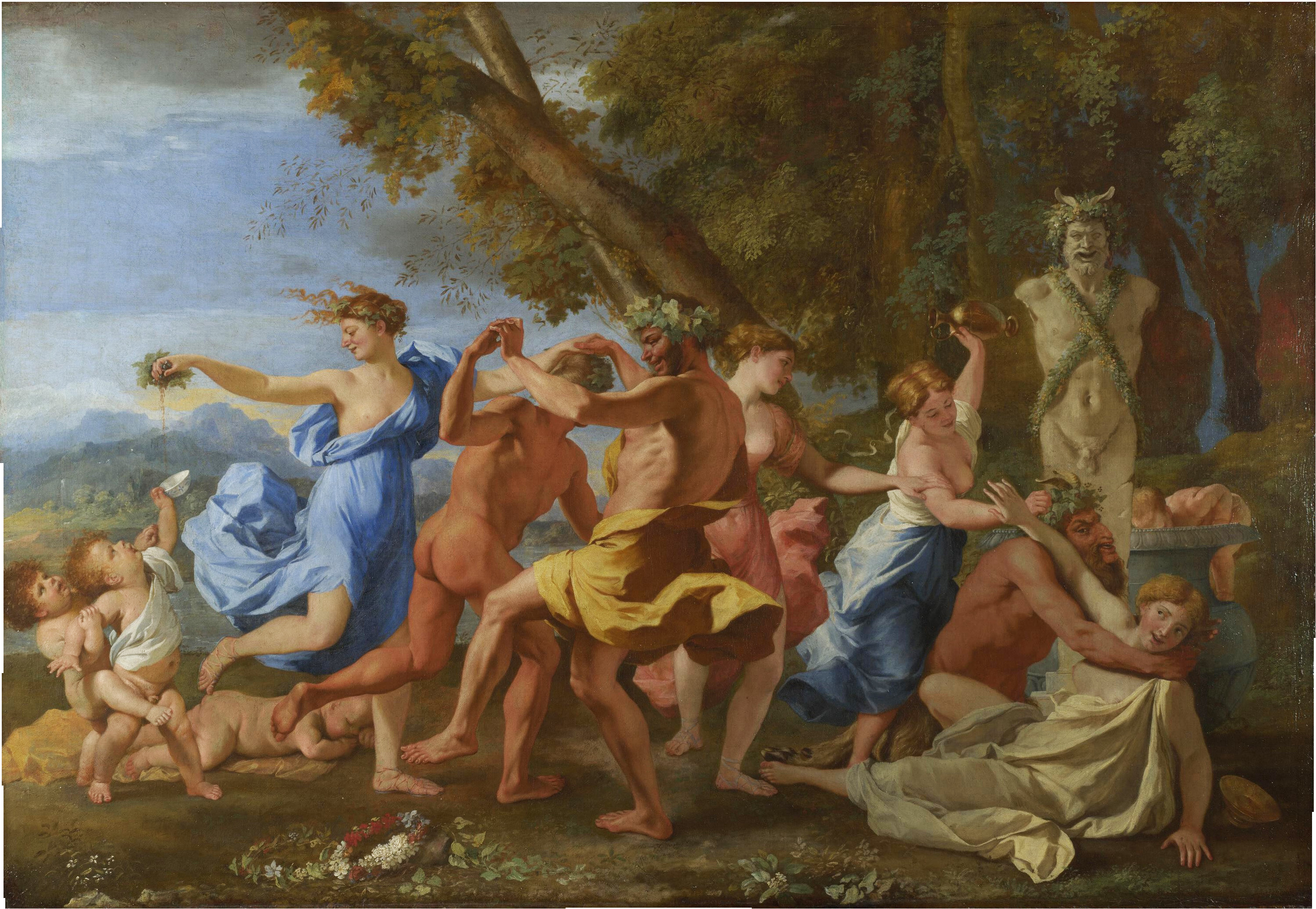
Nicolas Poussin - A Bacchanalian Revel before a Term (1632-3)

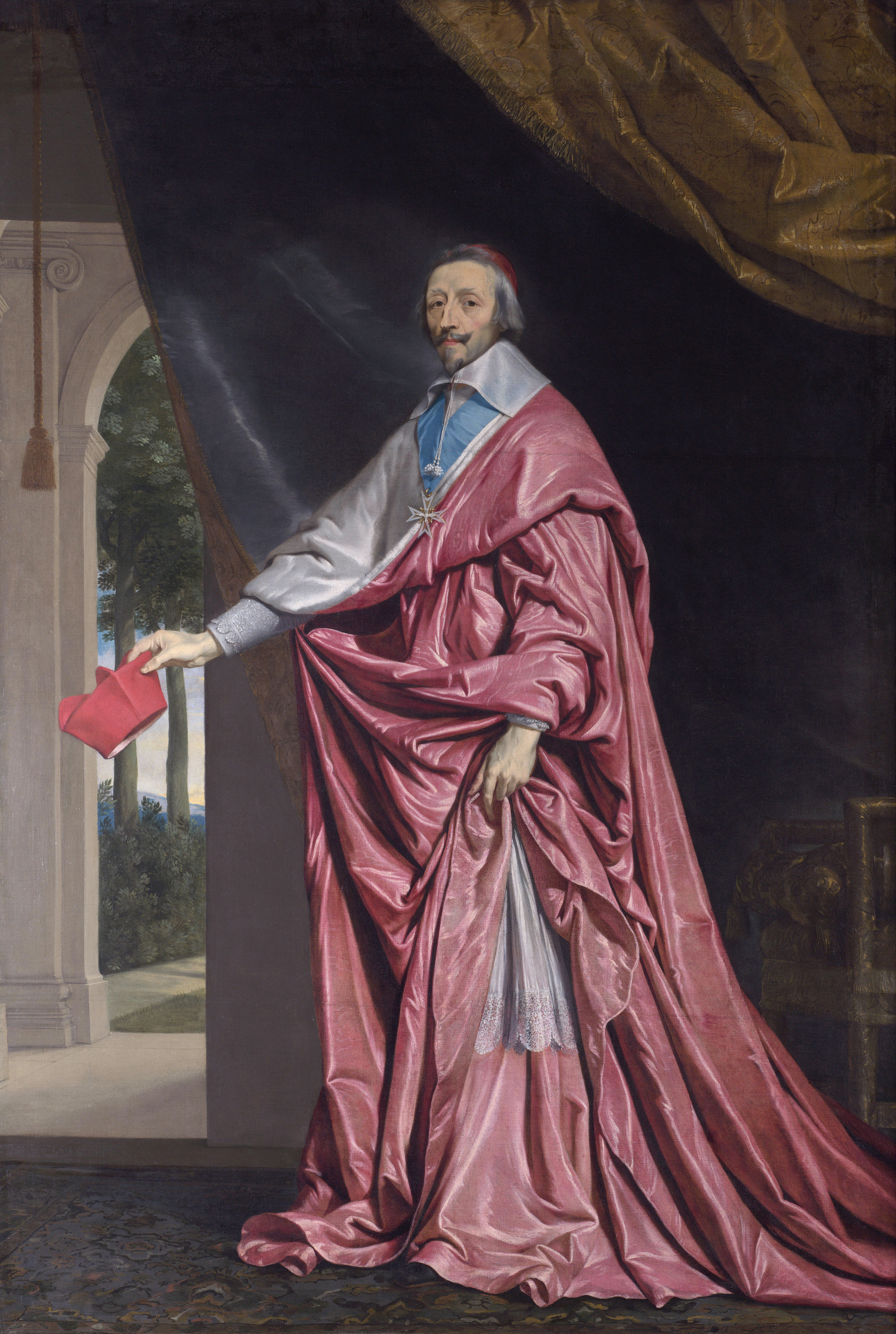
Philippe de Champaigne - Cardinal de Richelieu (1633–40)

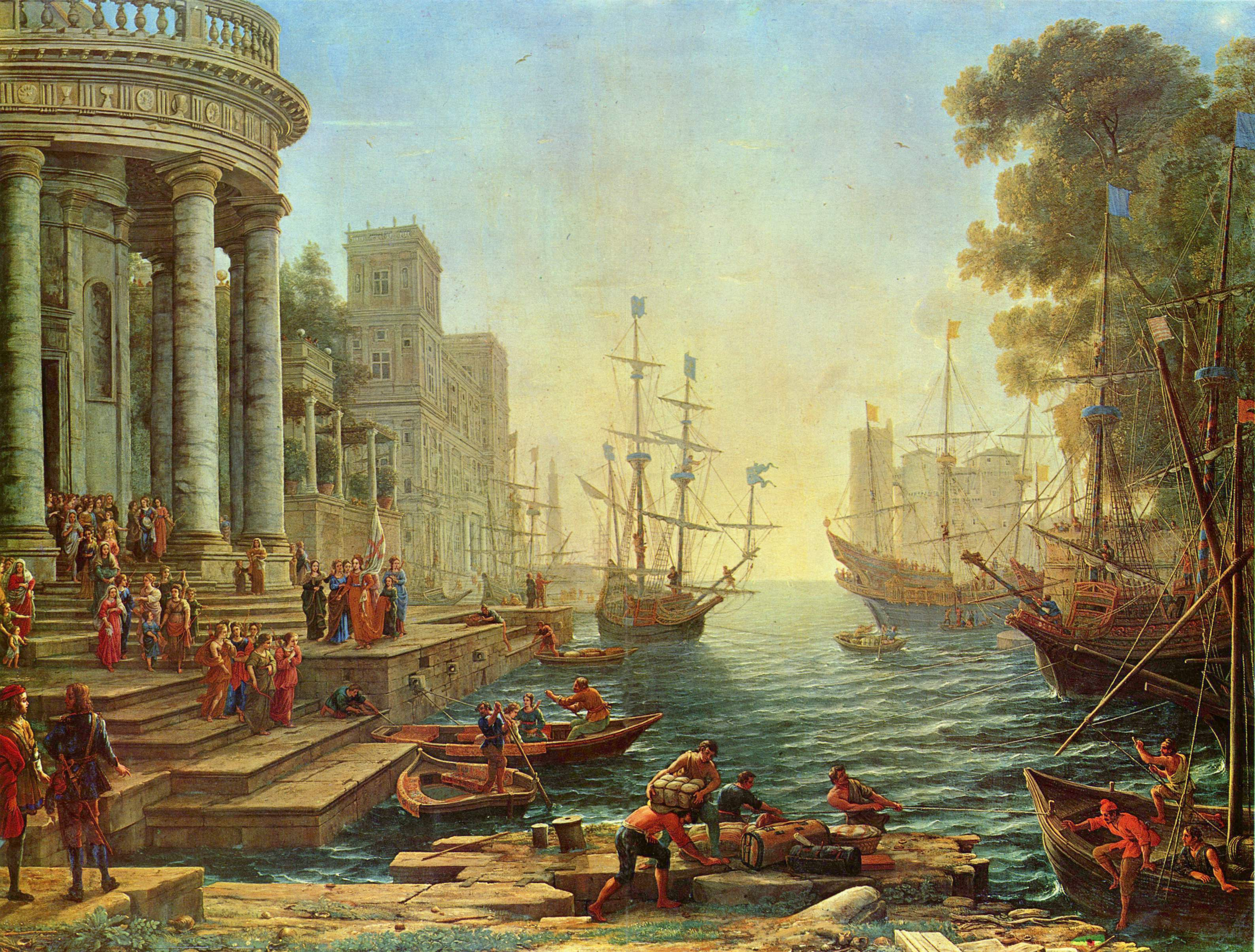
Claude Lorrain - Seaport with the Embarkation of Saint Ursula (1641)

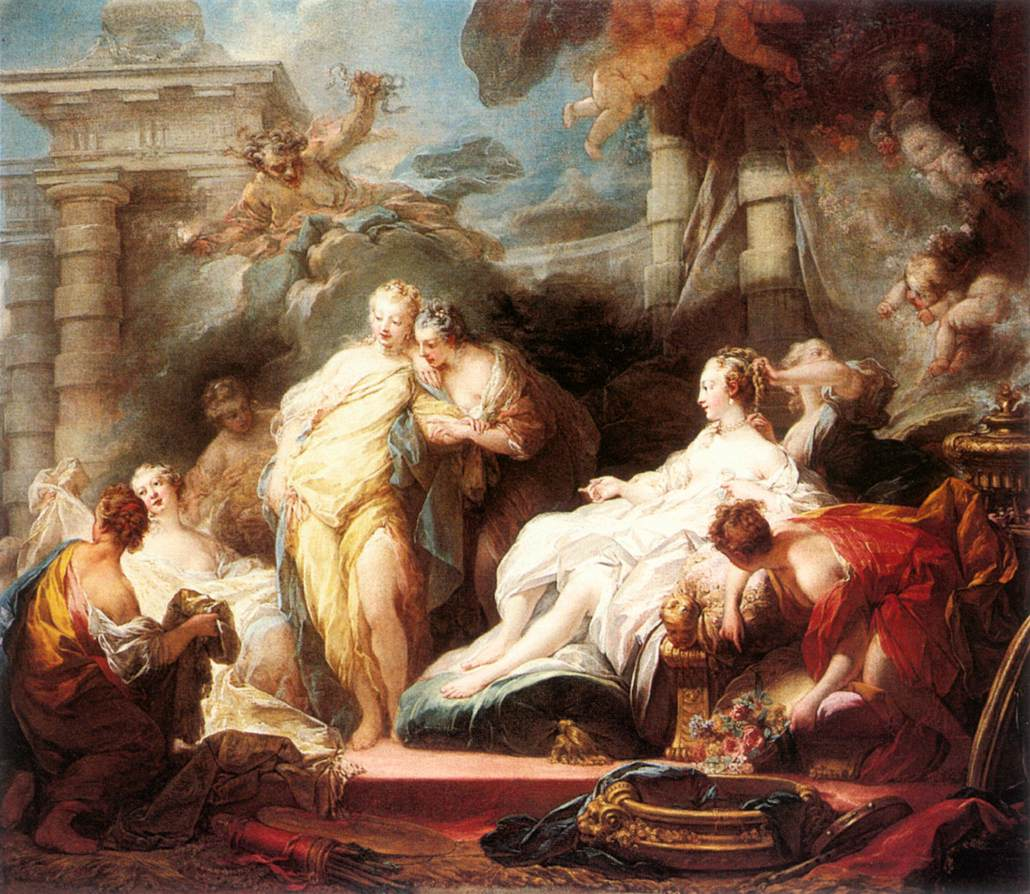
Jean-Honoré Fragonard - Psyche Showing Her Sisters Her Gifts from Cupid (1753)

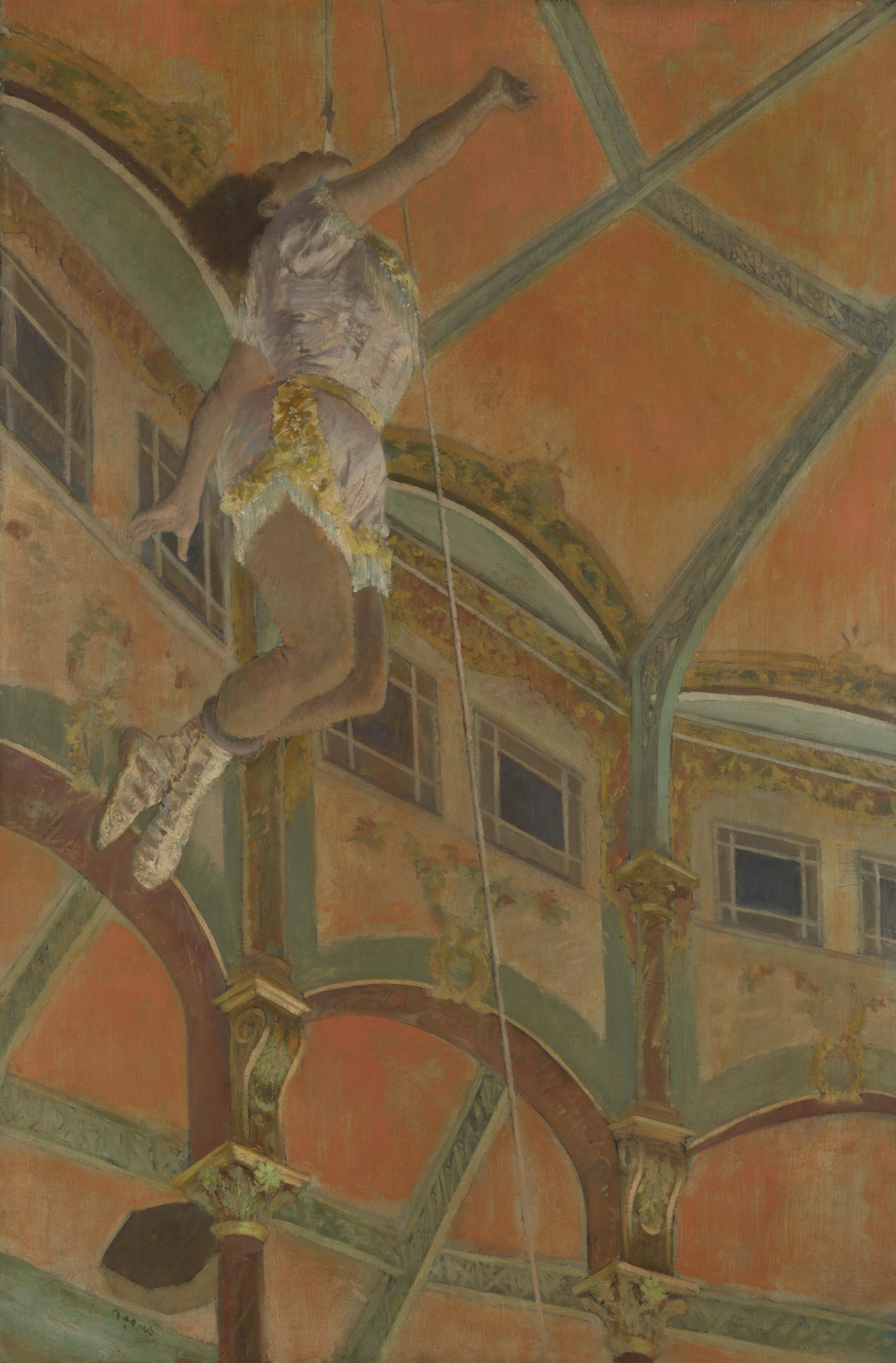
Edgar Degas, Miss La La at the Cirque Fernando, (1879)

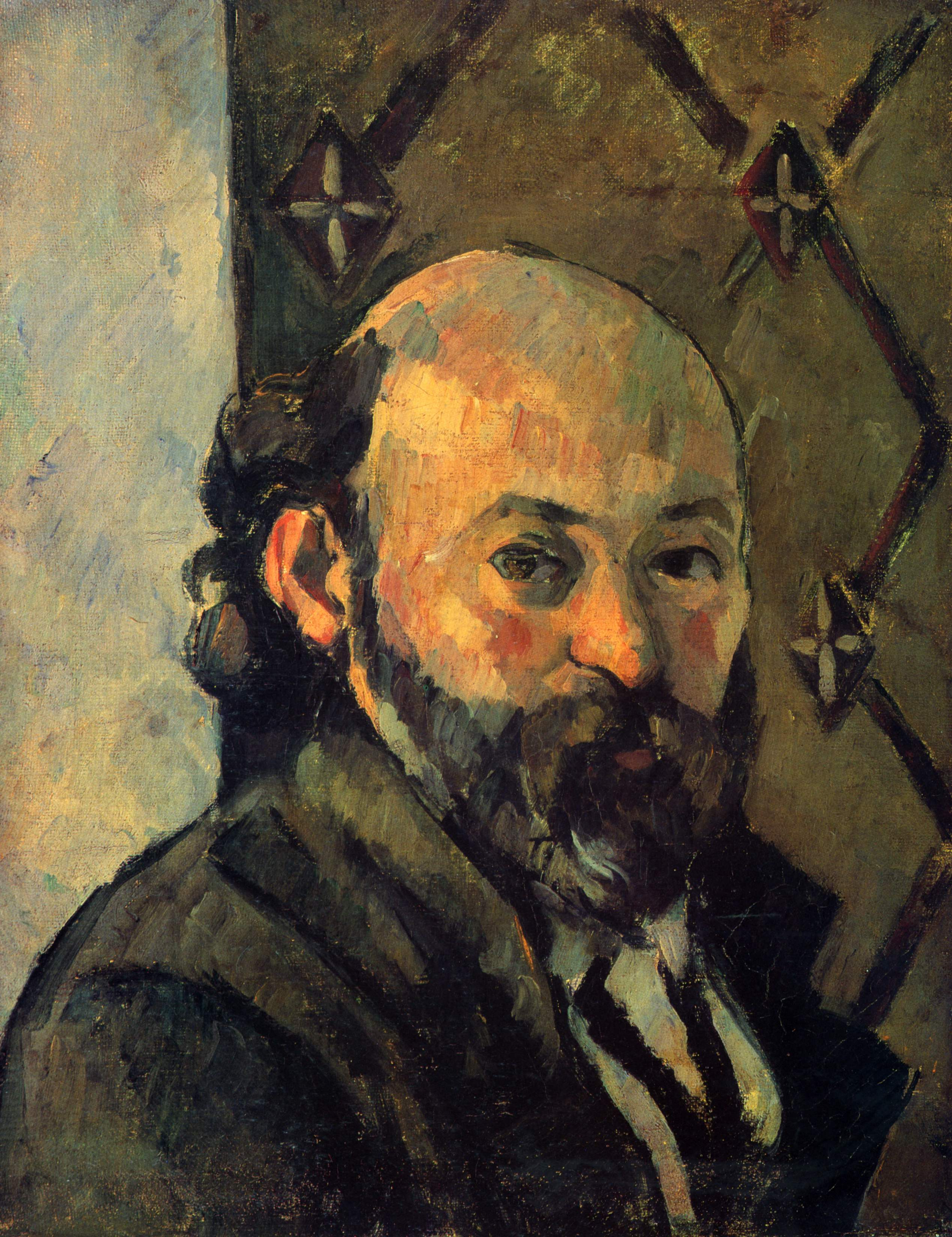
Paul Cézanne, Self-Portrait, (1881)

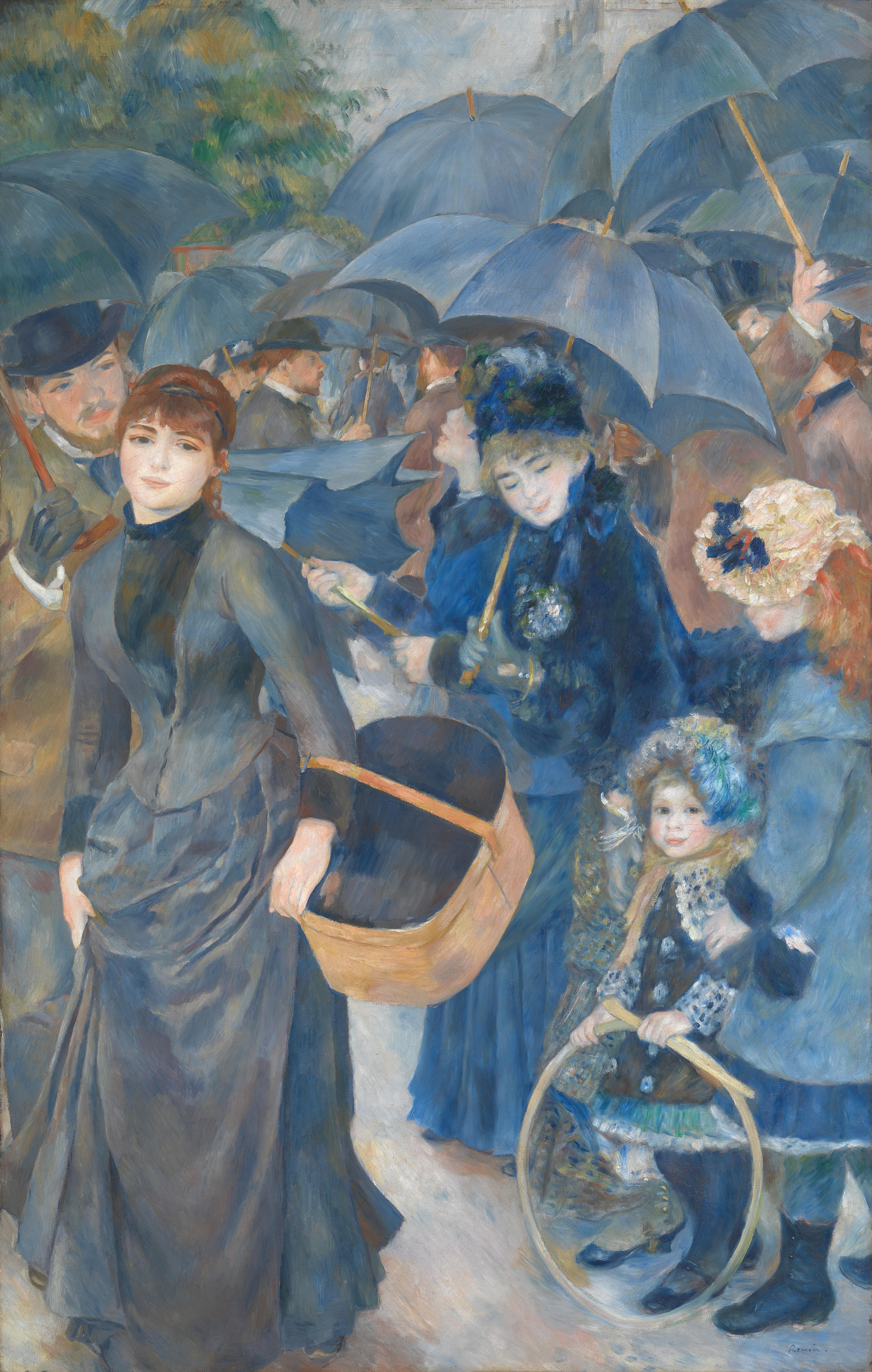
Pierre-Auguste Renoir -The Umbrellas(1883)

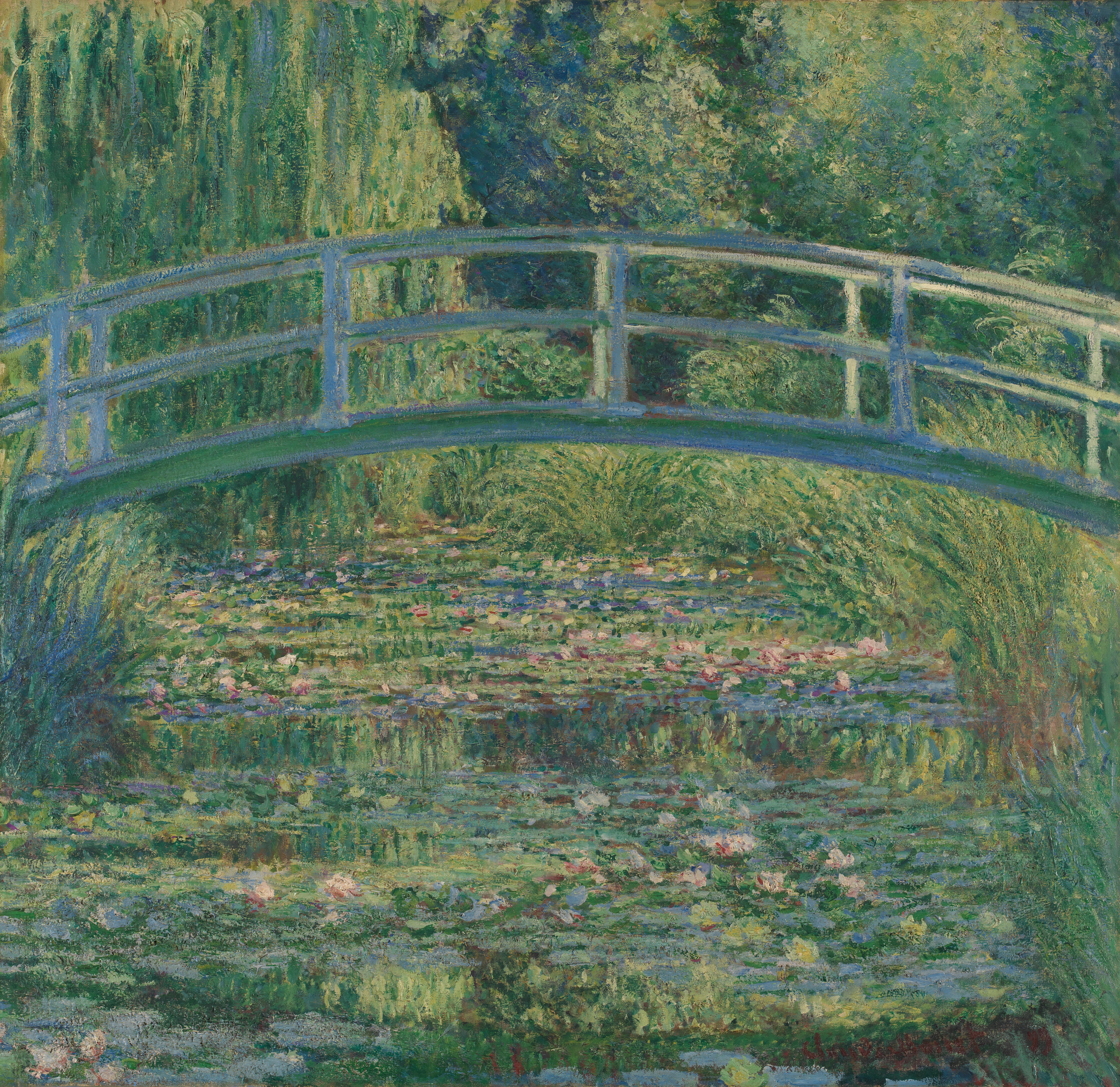
Claude Monet, The Water-Lily Pond, (1899)

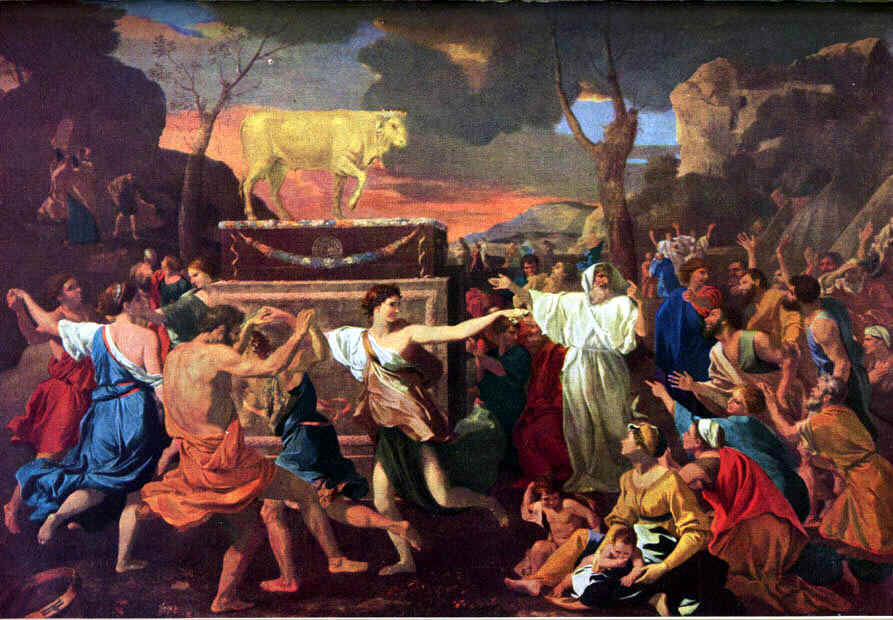
Nicolas Poussin- The Adoration of the Golden Calf, (1633–1634)

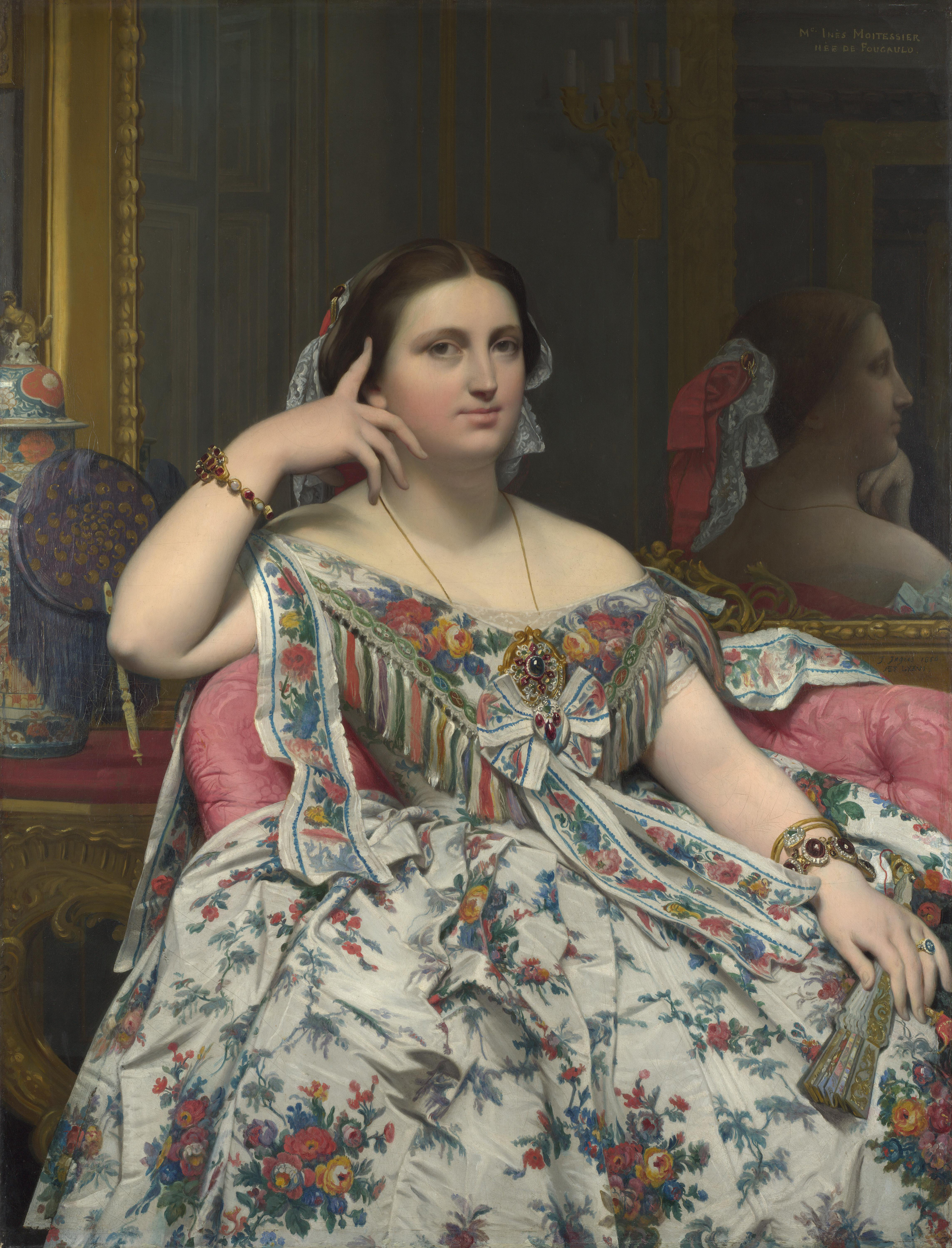
Jean Auguste Dominique Ingres, Madame Moitessier, 1856

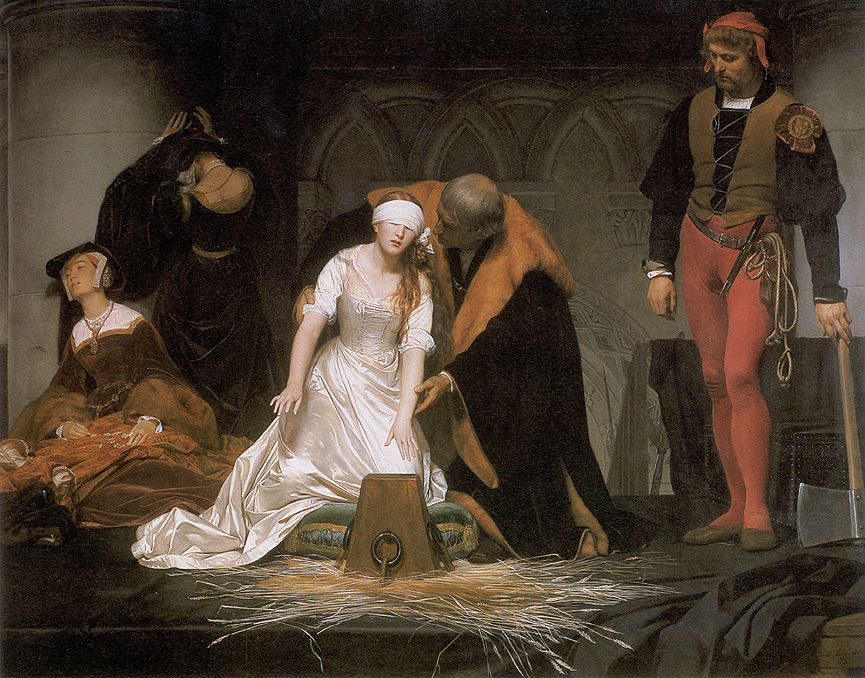
Paul Delaroche, The Execution of Lady Jane Grey, 1833

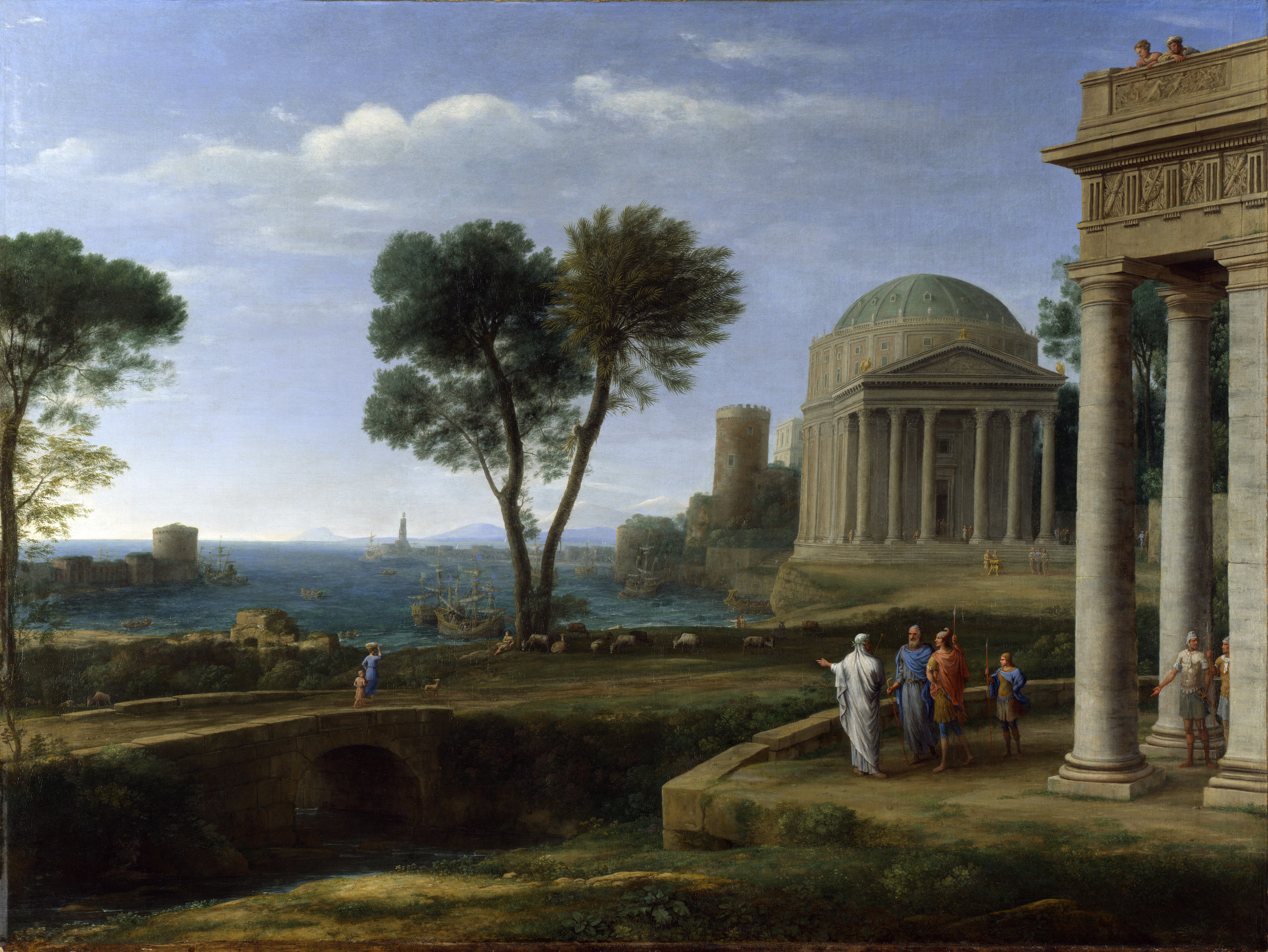
Claude Lorrain, Landscape with Aeneas at Delos, 1672

German Paintings

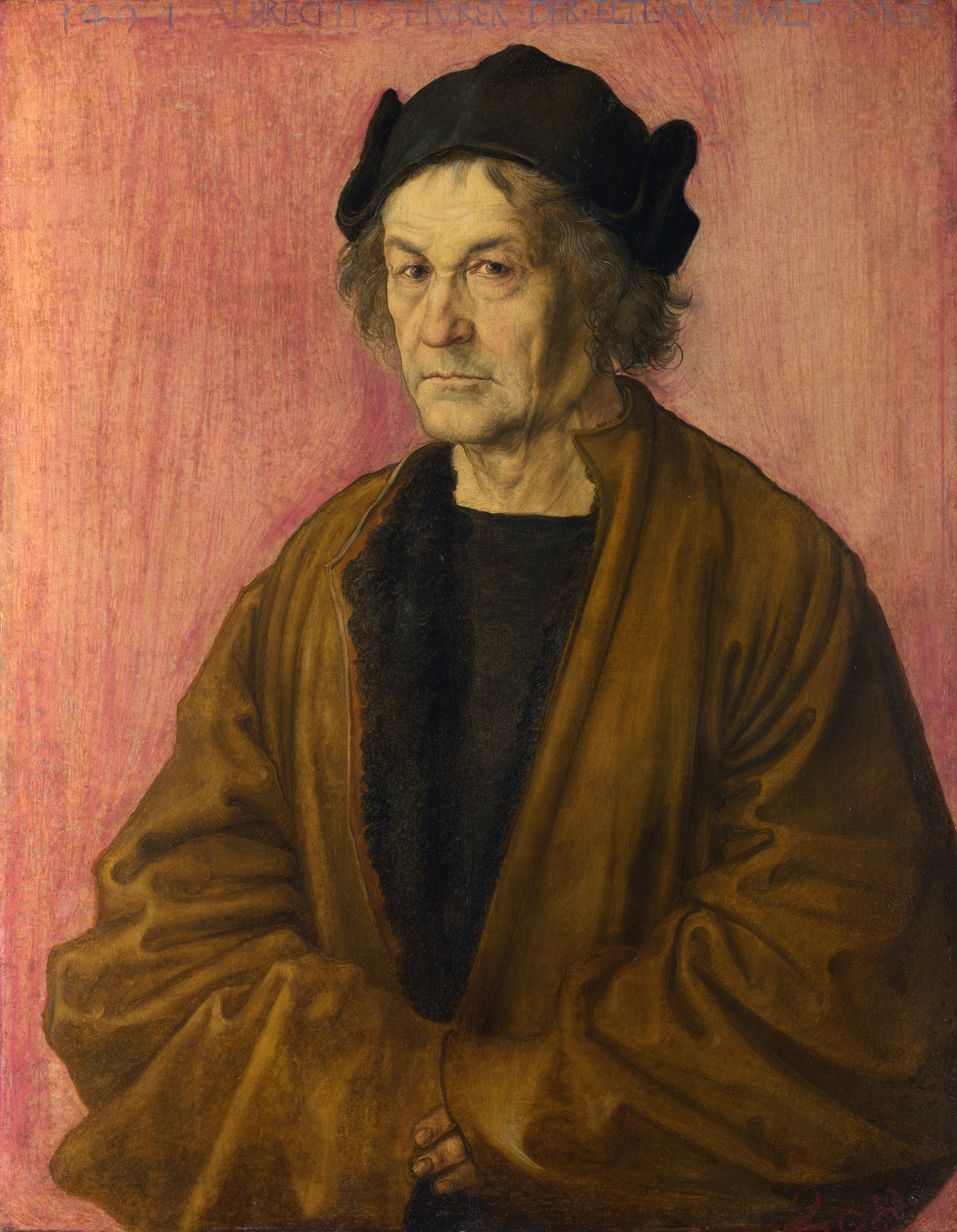
Albrecht Dürer, Portrait of Dürer's Father at 70, (1497)

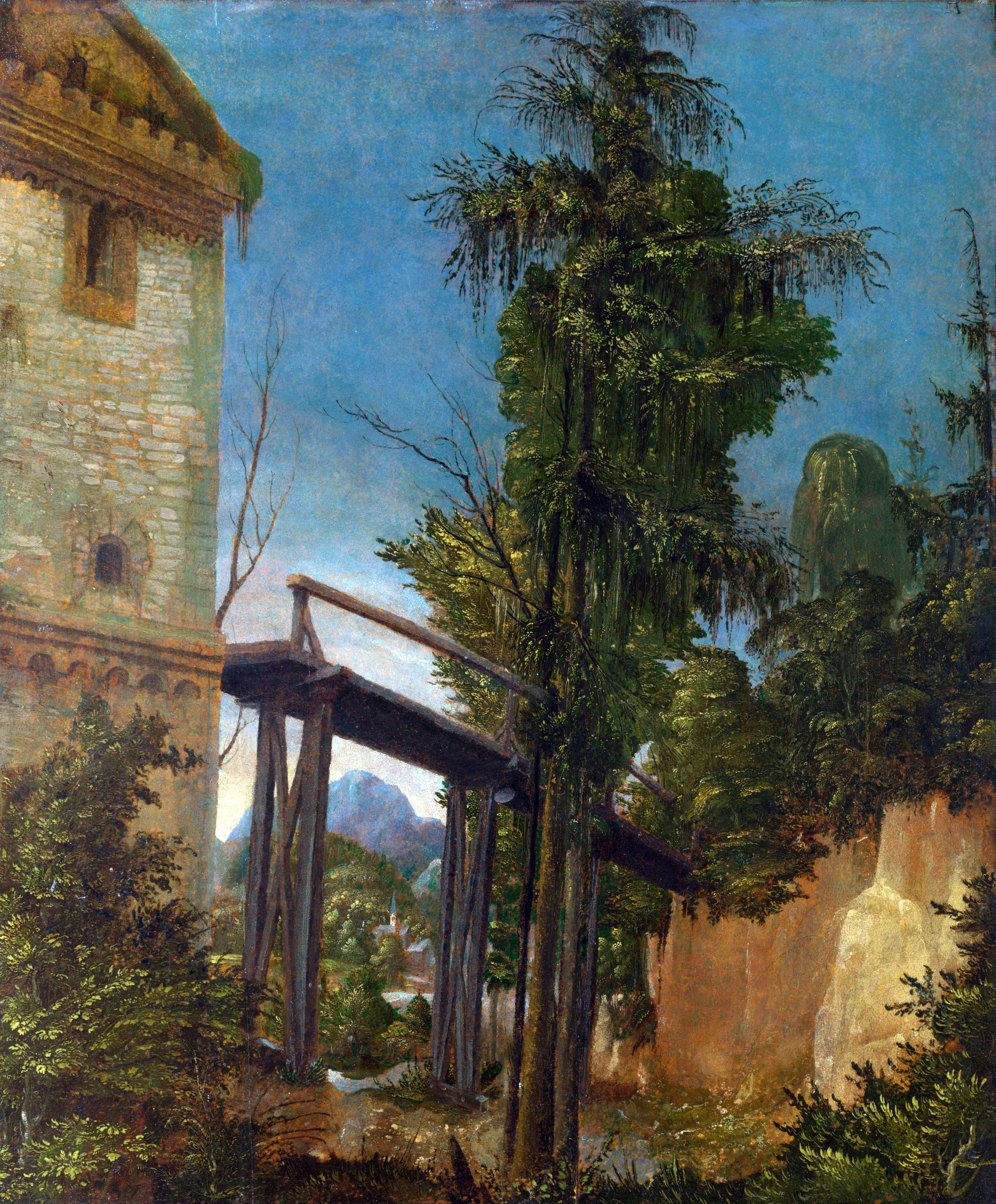
Albrecht Altdorfer, Landscape with Path, c. (1516)

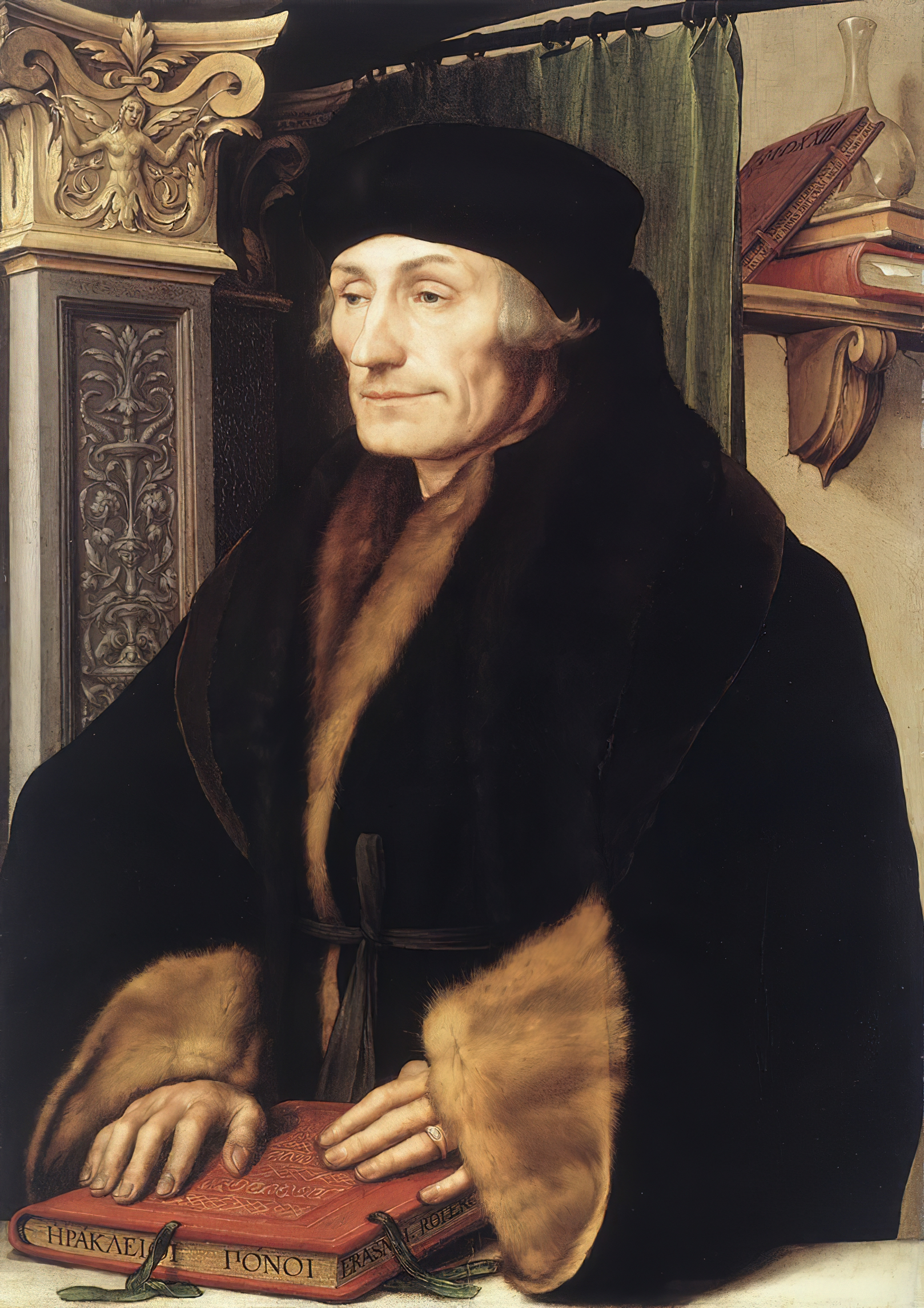
Hans Holbein the Younger, Portrait of Erasmus of Rotterdam, (1523)

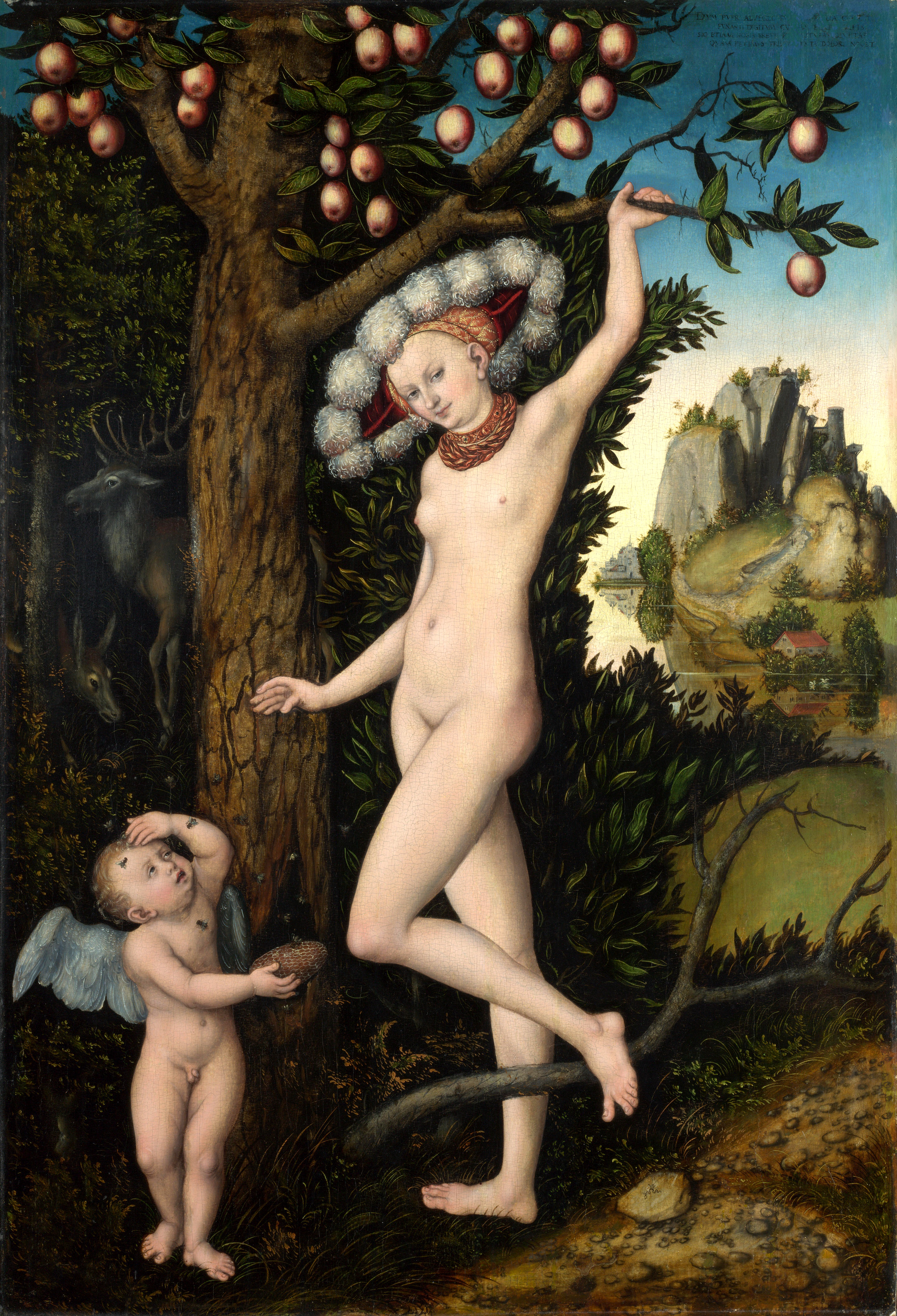
Lucas Cranach the Elder, Cupid complaining to Venus, (1525)

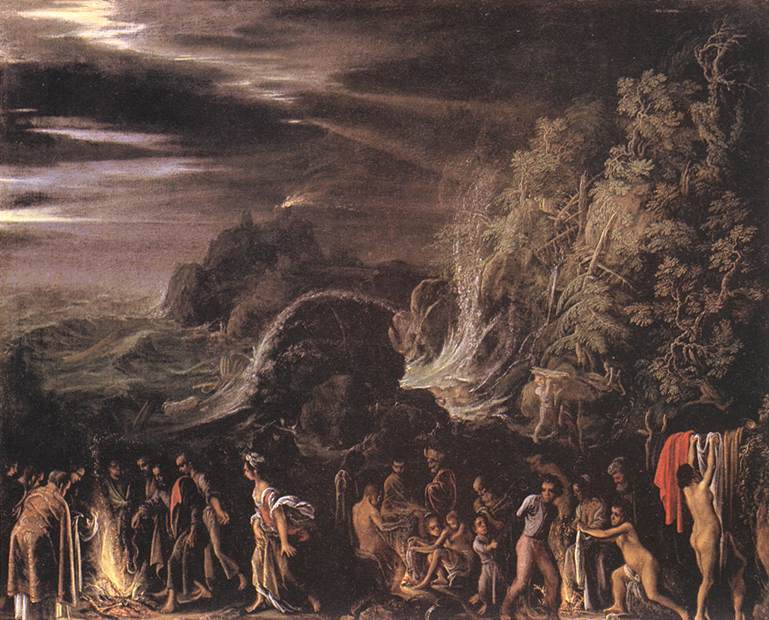
Adam Elsheimer, St. Paul at Malta, c. (1600)

Caspar David Friedrich, Winter Landscape, (1811)

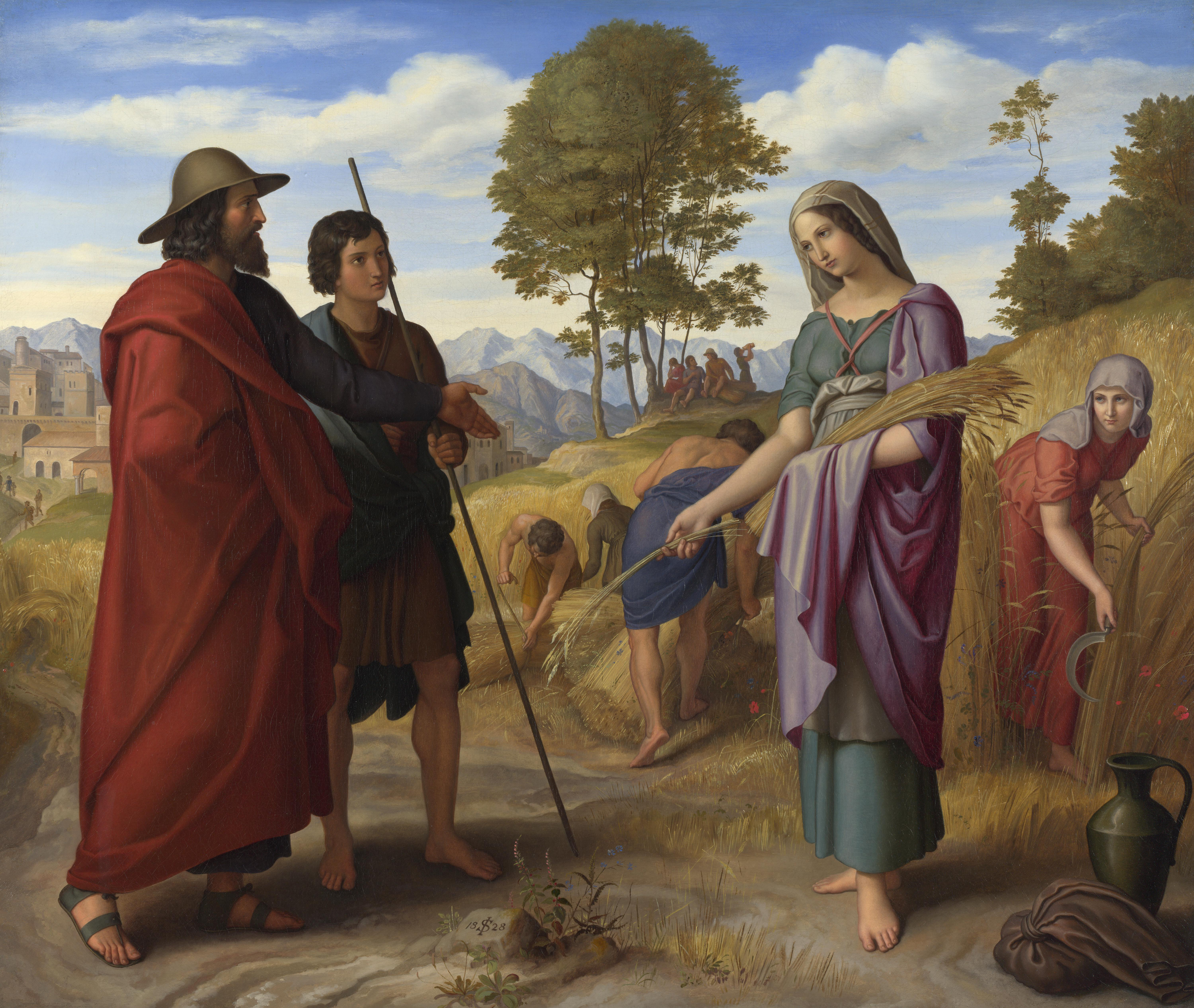
Julius Schnorr von Carolsfeld, Ruth in Boaz's Field, (1828)

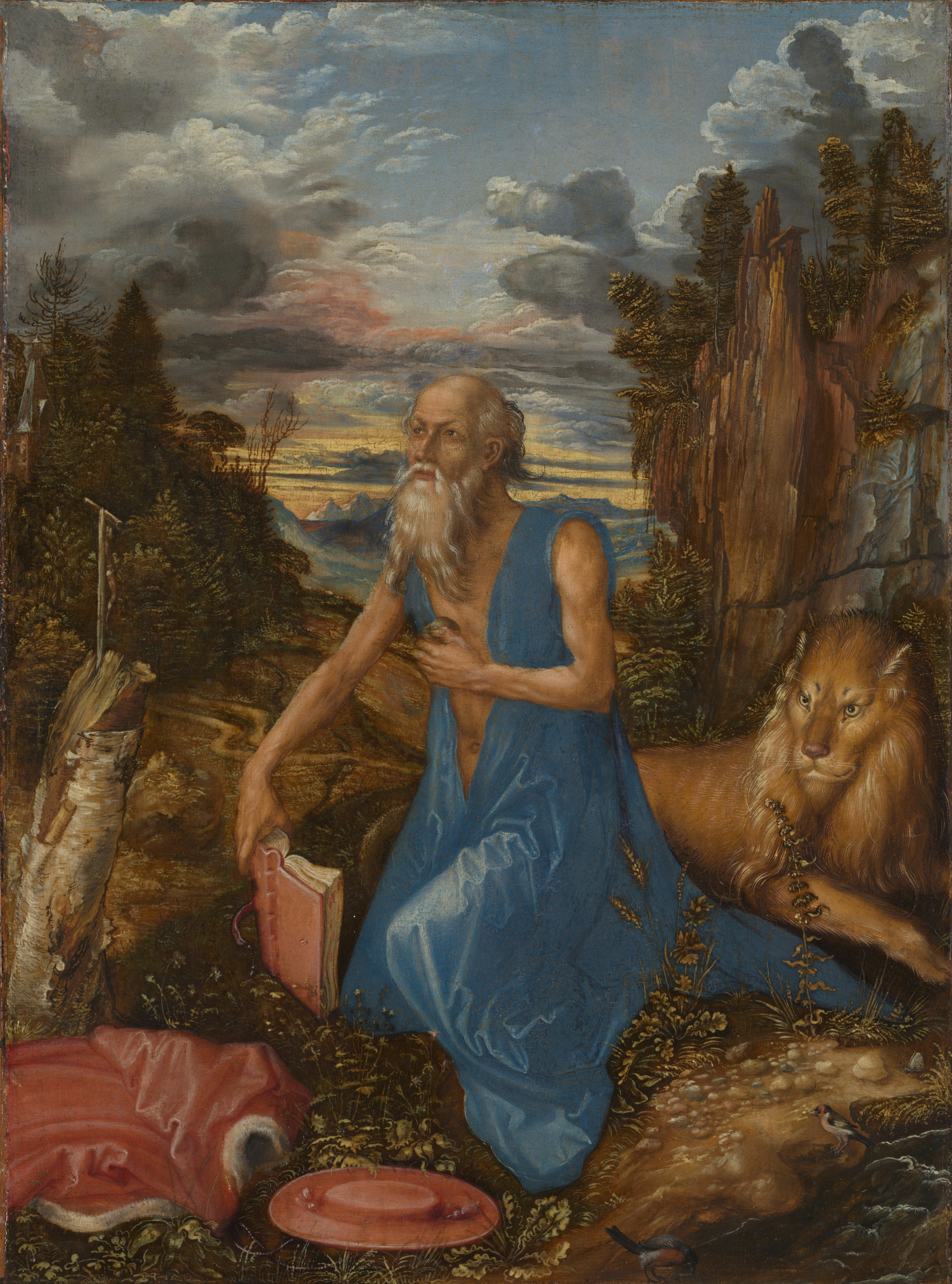
Albrecht Dürer, St. Jerome in the Wilderness, 1495, oil on panel,

Italian Paintings

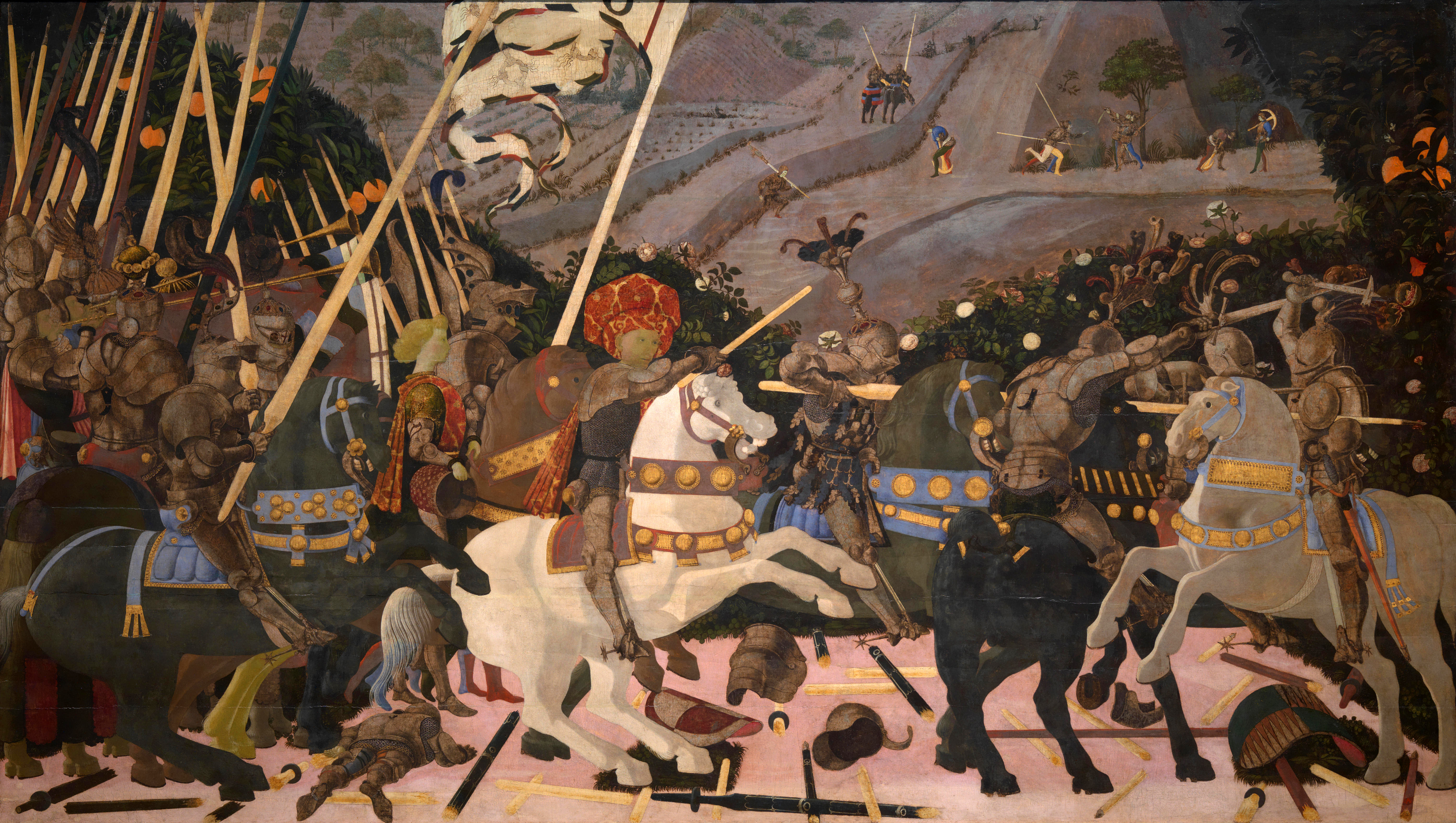
Paolo Uccello - The Battle of San Romano (1438–40)

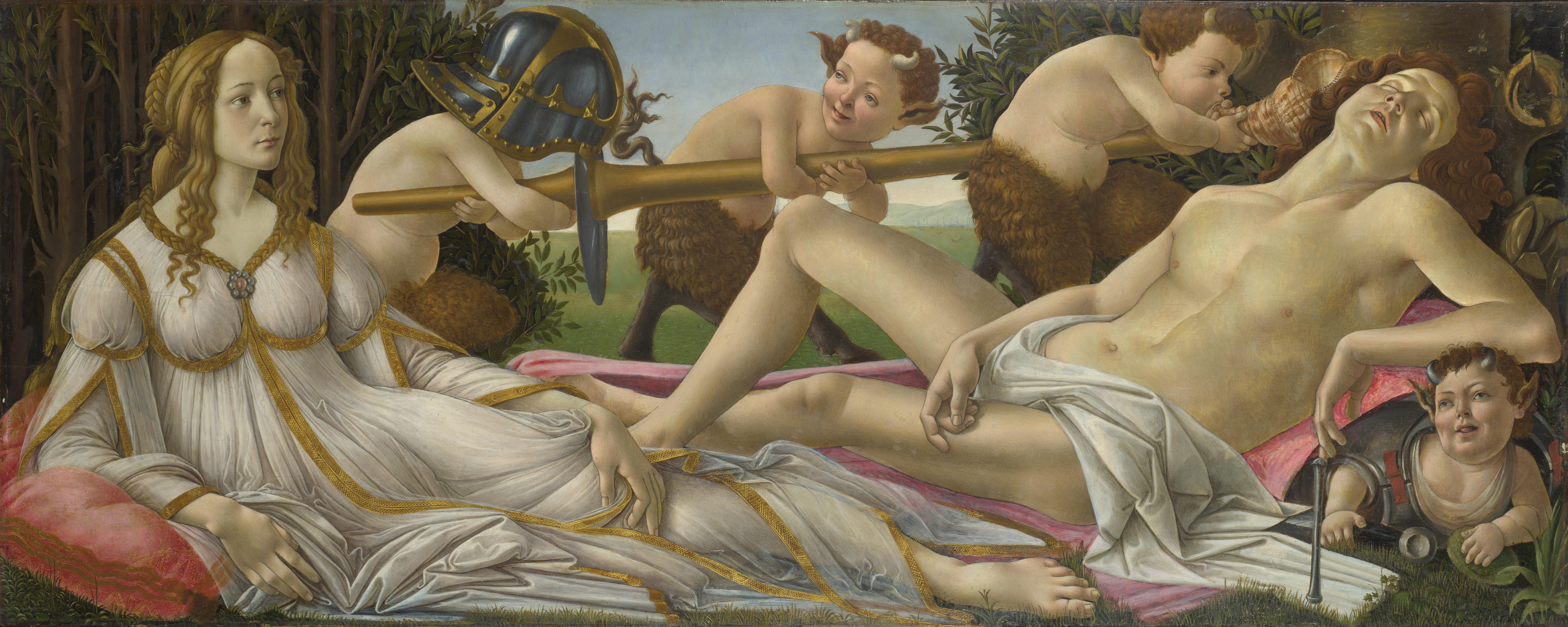
Sandro Botticelli - Venus and Mars (1485)

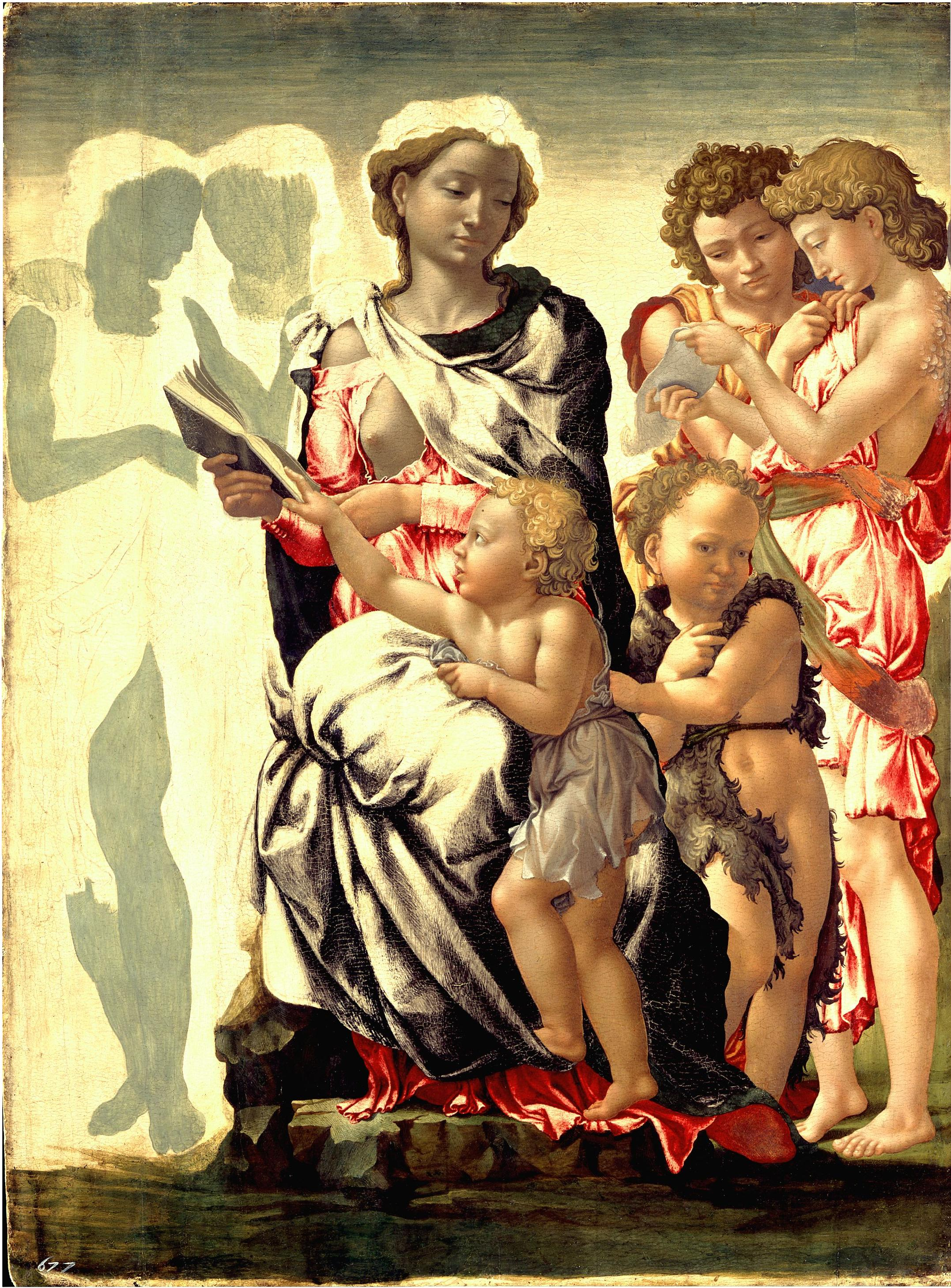
Michelangelo - The Virgin and Child with Saint John and Angels (the Manchester Madonna) (1497)

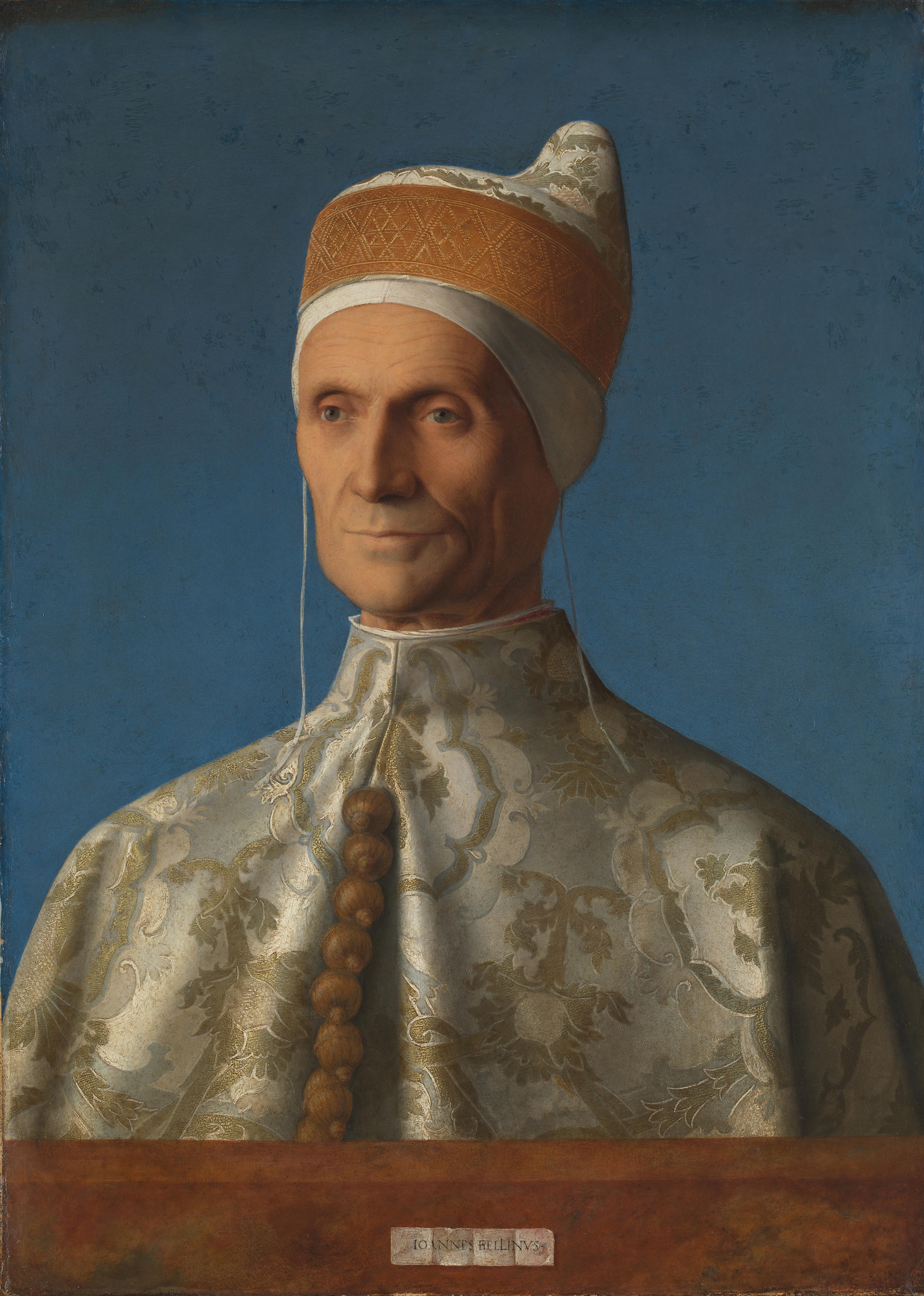
Giovanni Bellini - The Doge Leonardo Loredan (1501-4)

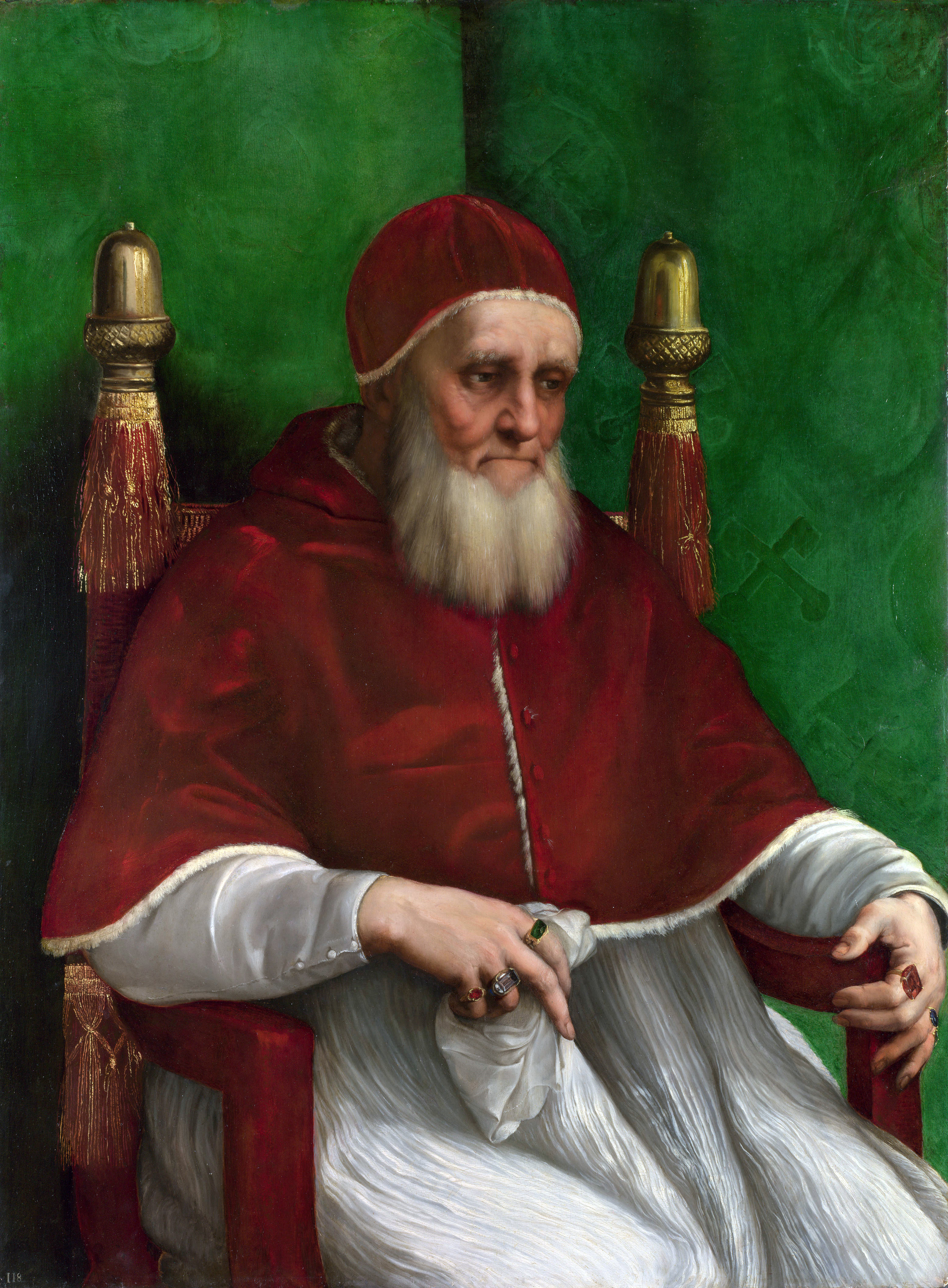
Raphael - Portrait of Julius II (1511)

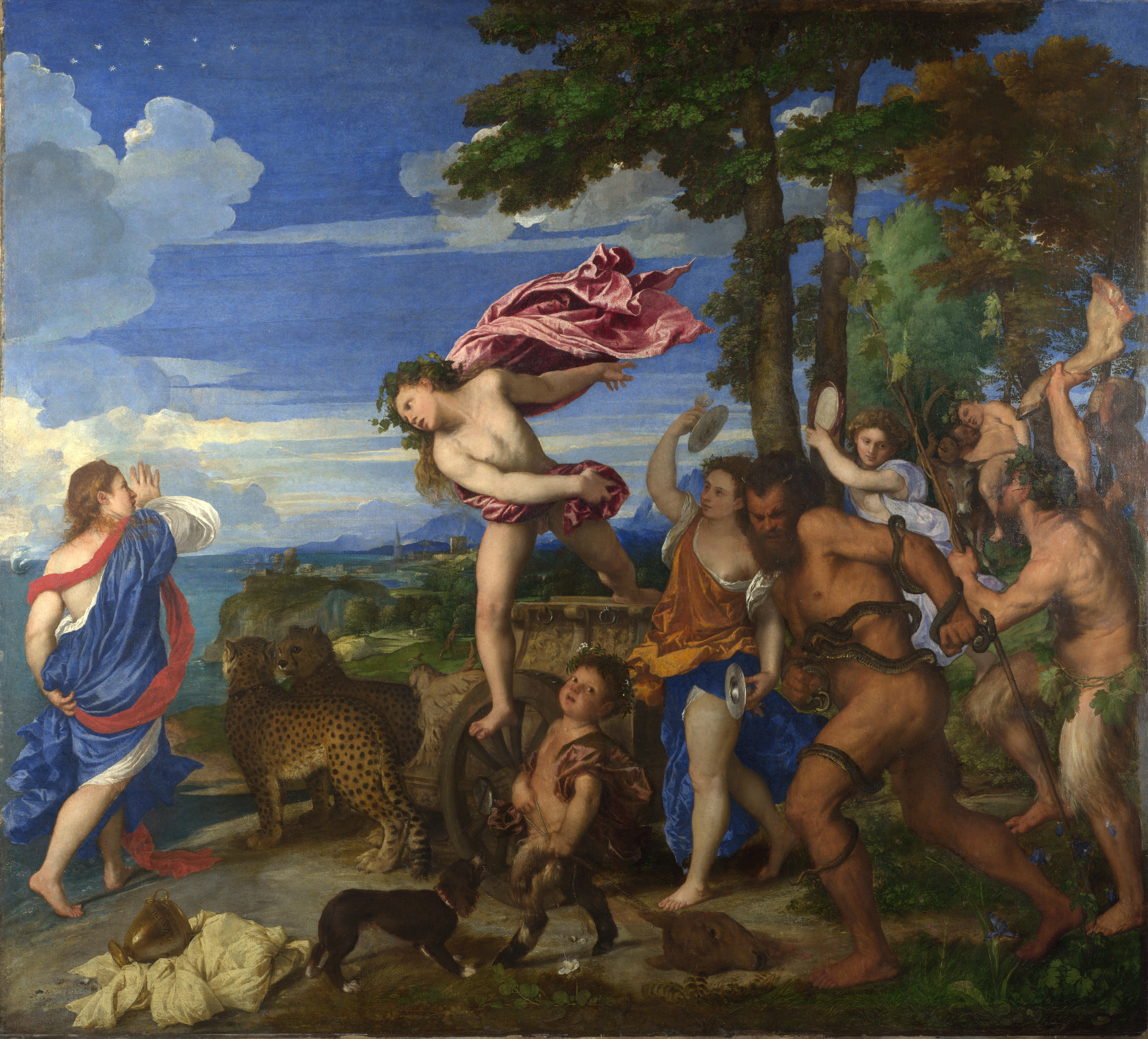
Titian - Bacchus and Ariadne (1520–23)

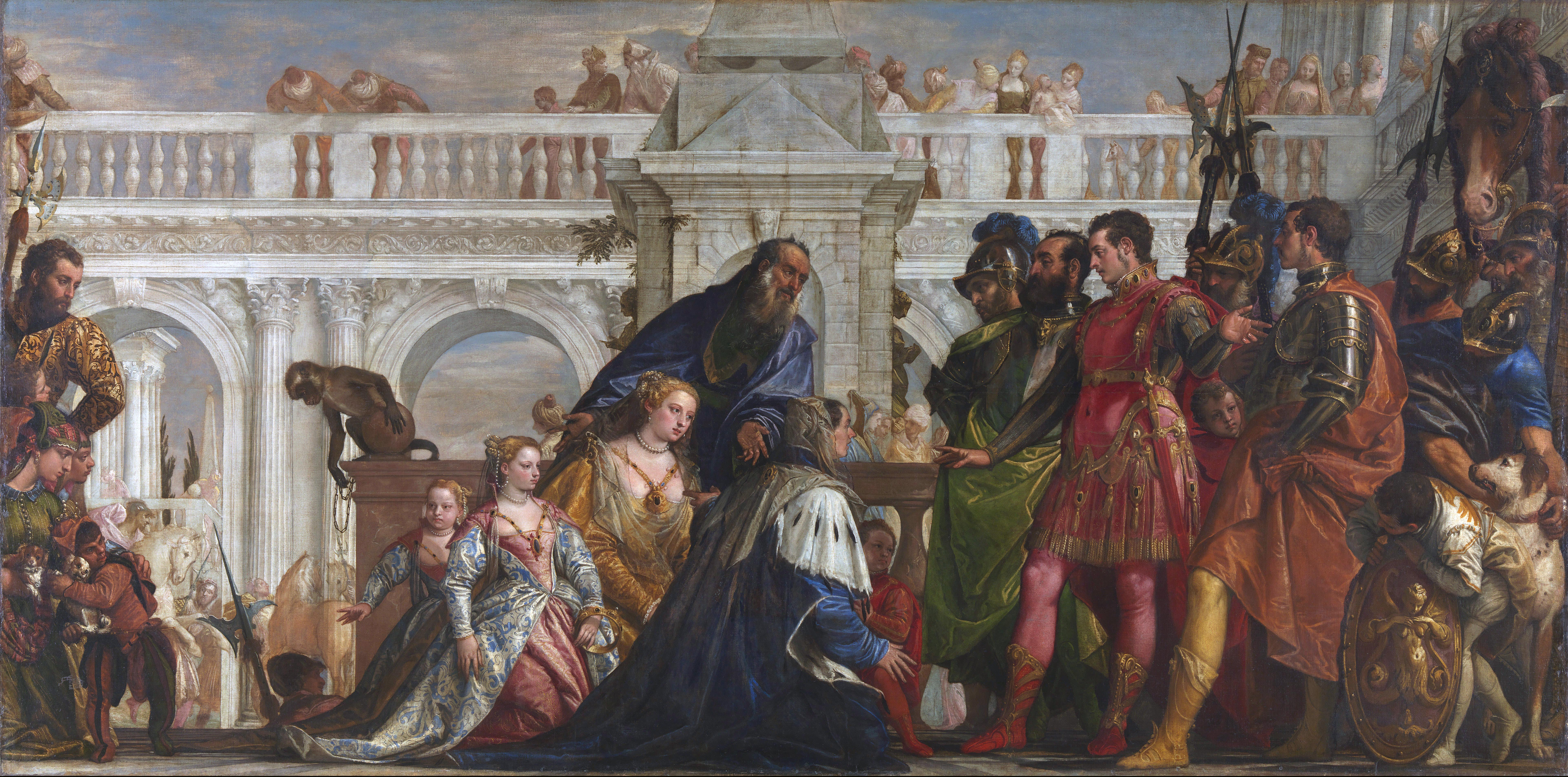
Paolo Veronese - The Family of Darius before Alexander (1565–70)

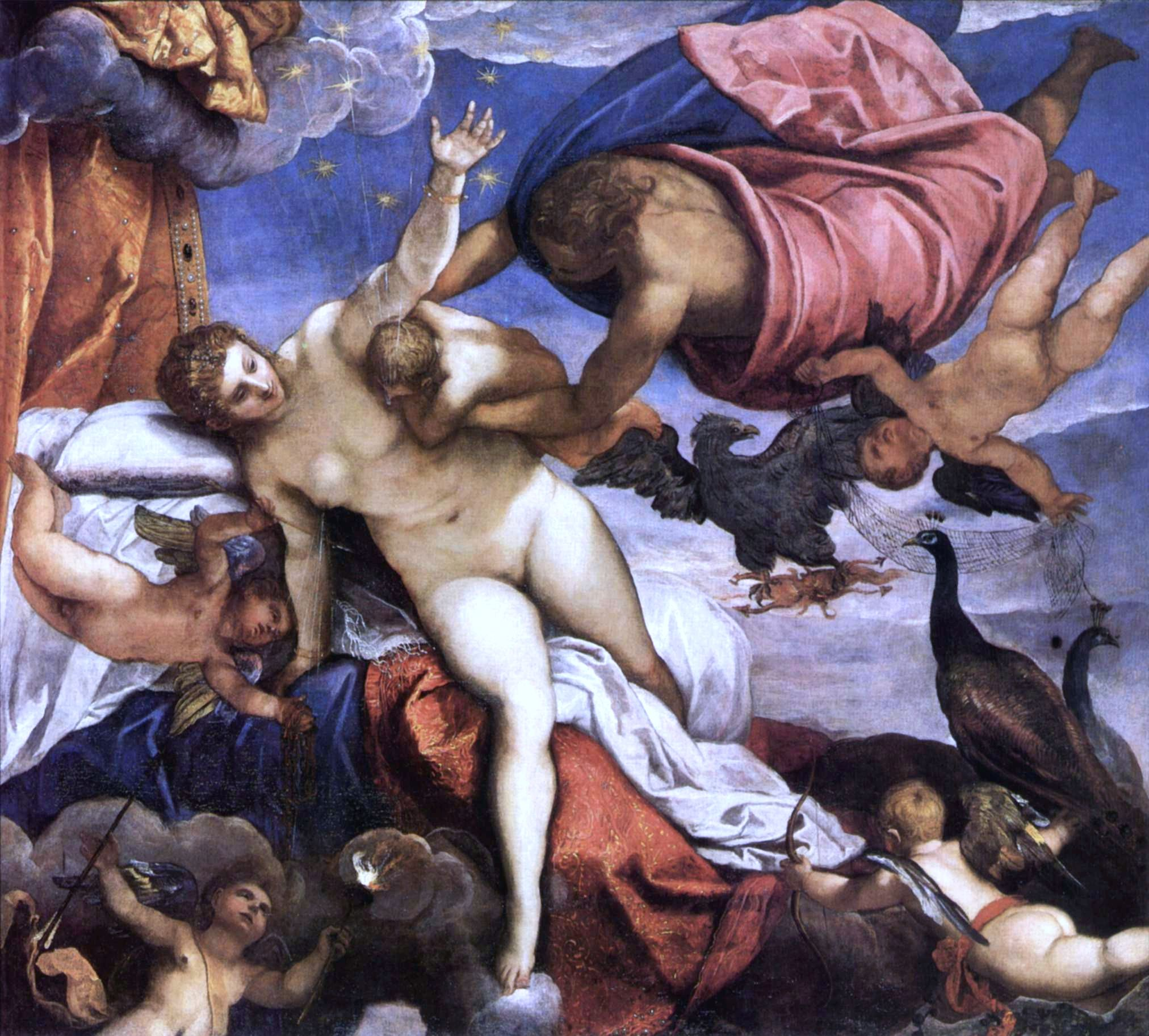
Tintoretto - The Origin of the Milky Way (1575)

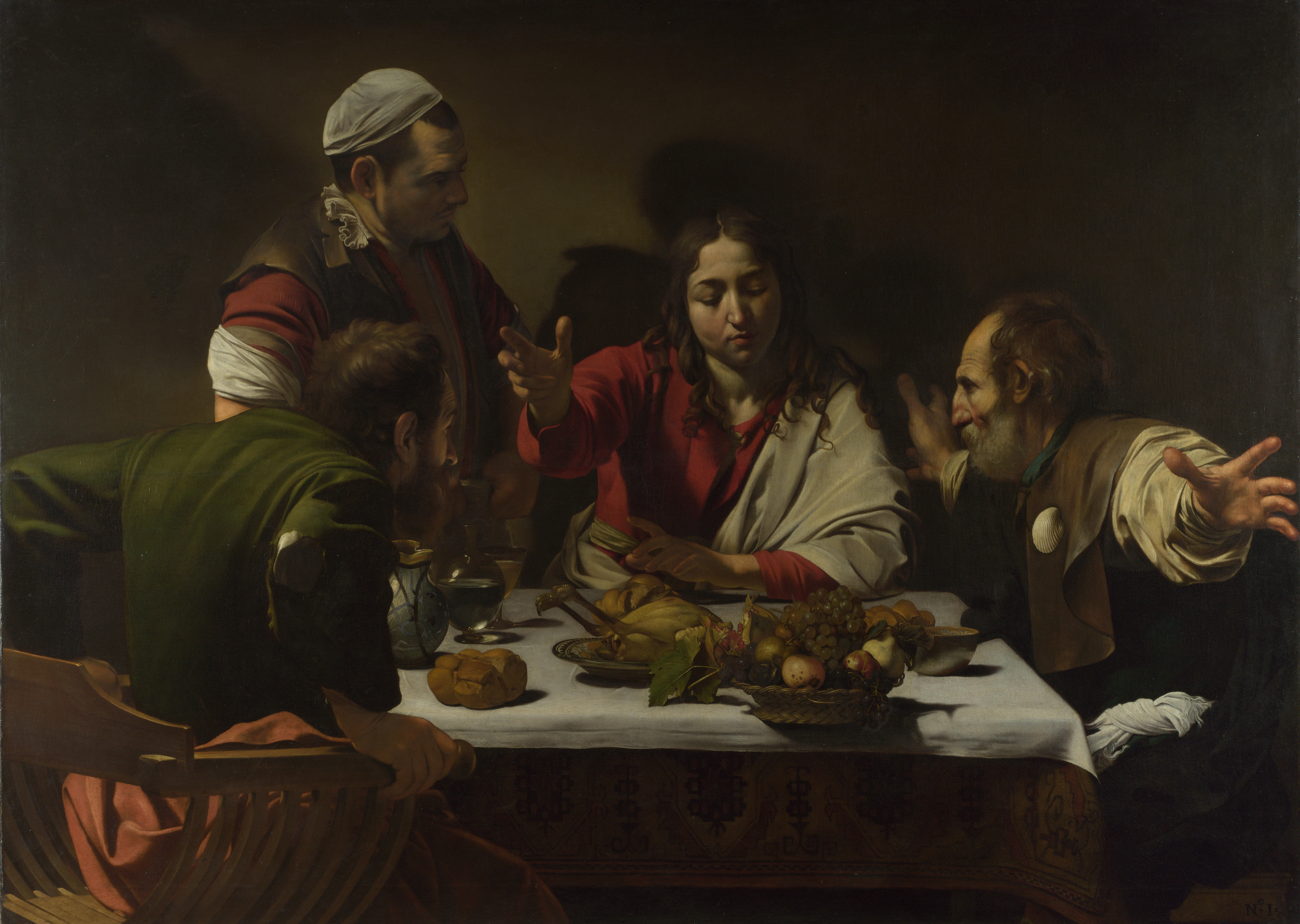
Michelangelo Merisi da Caravaggio - The Supper at Emmaus (1601)

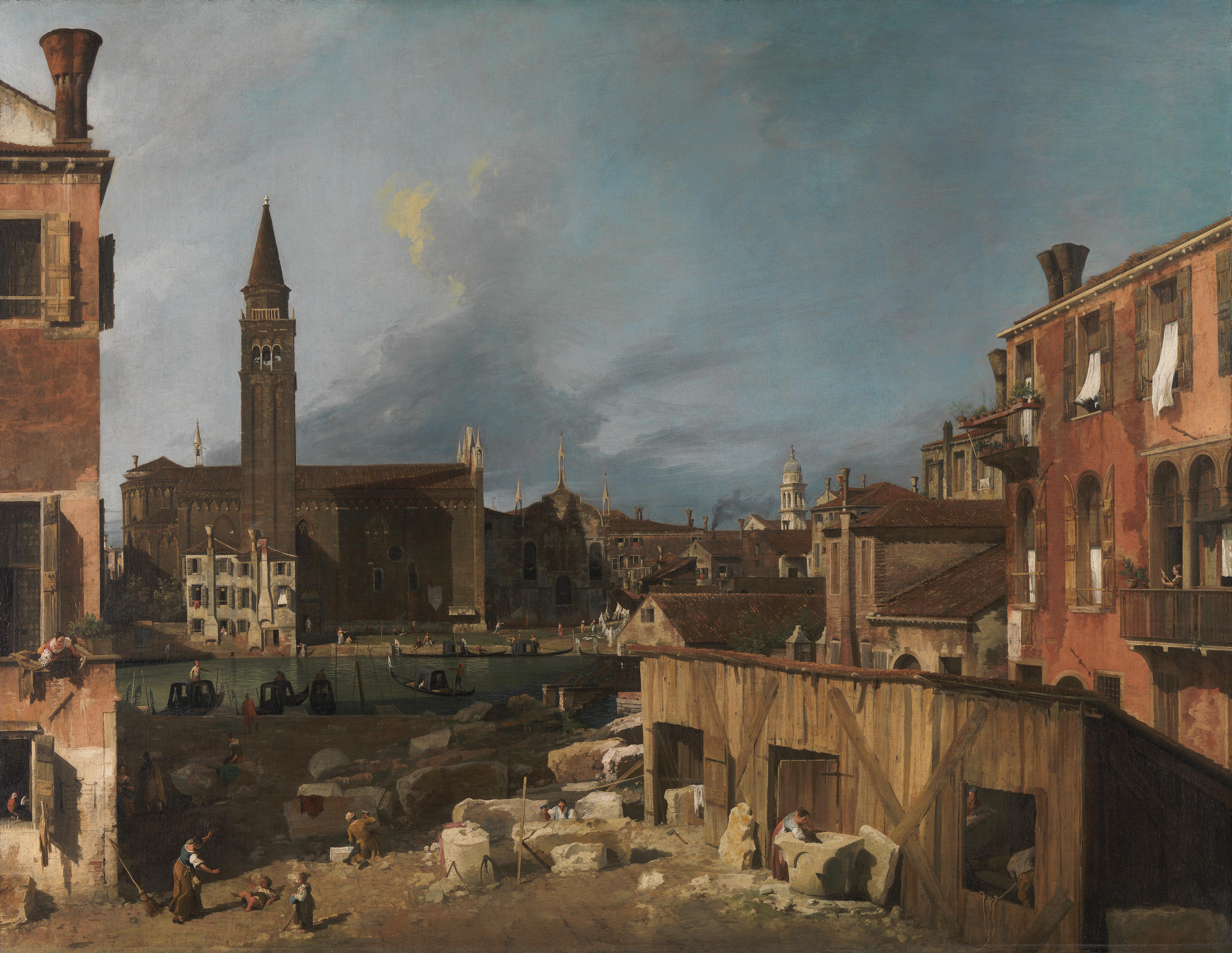
Canaletto - The Stonemason's Yard(1726–30)

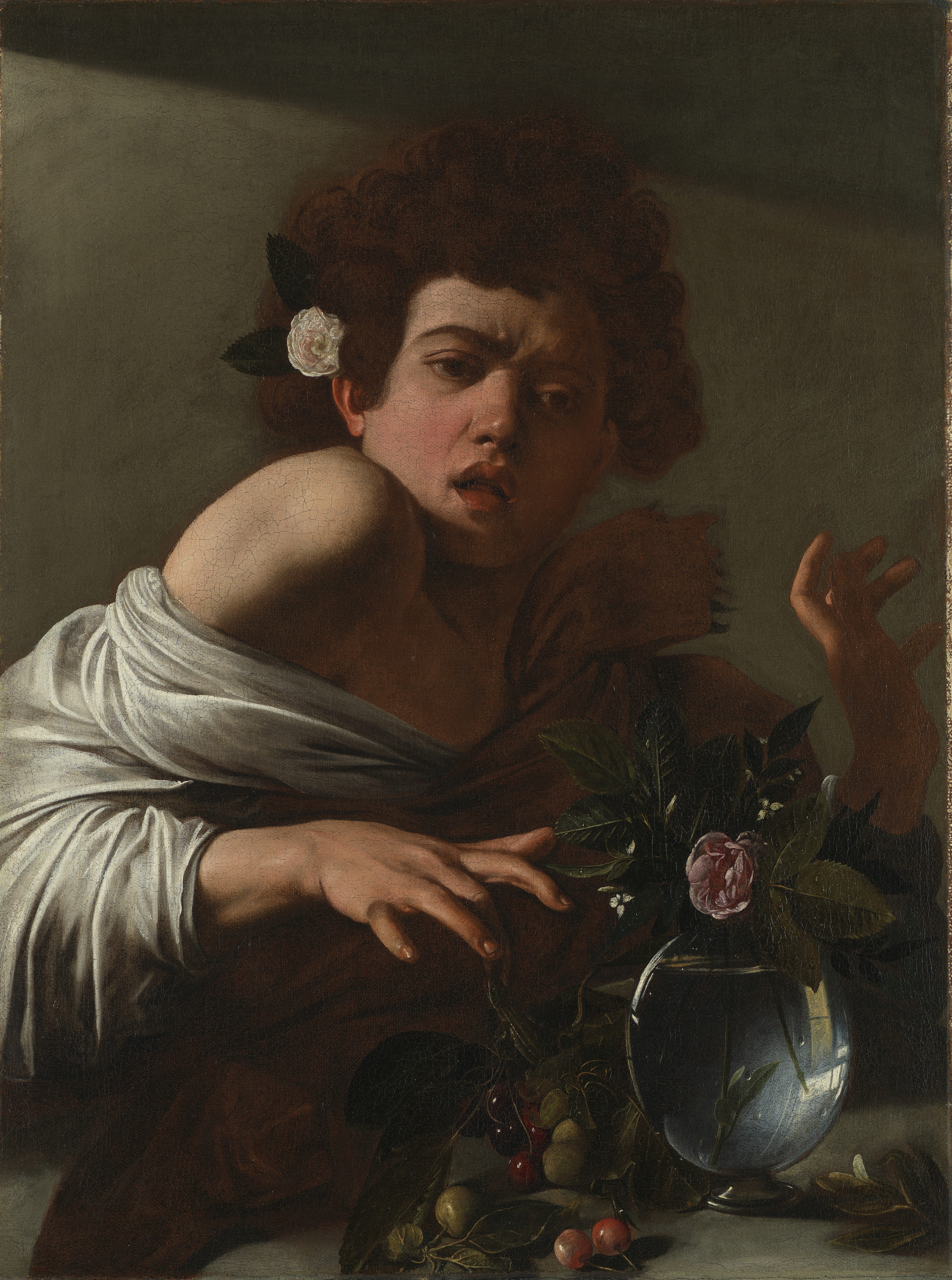
Caravaggio - Boy Bitten by a Lizard (1596)

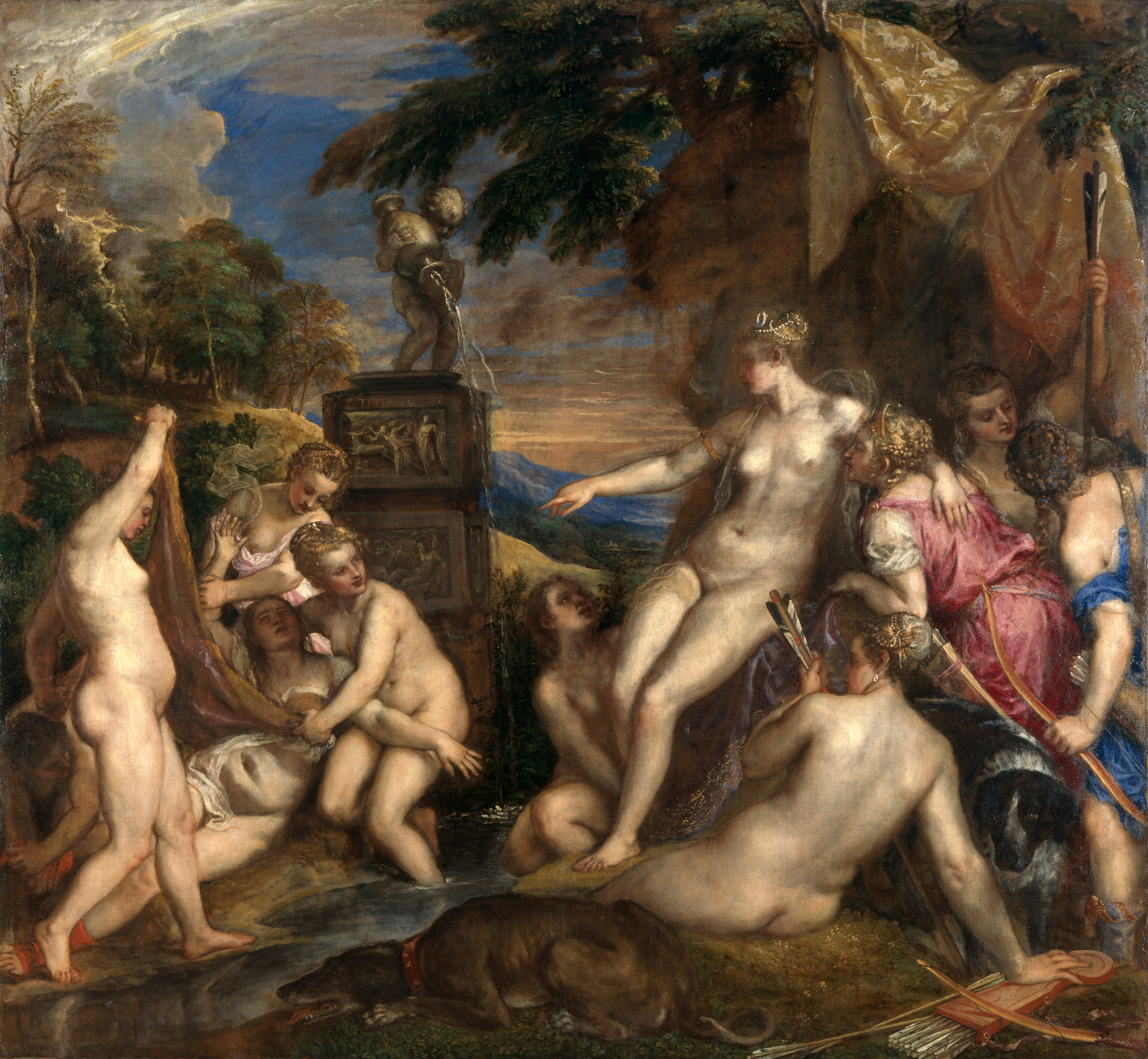
Titian, Diana and Callisto, 1556–9

Spanish Paintings

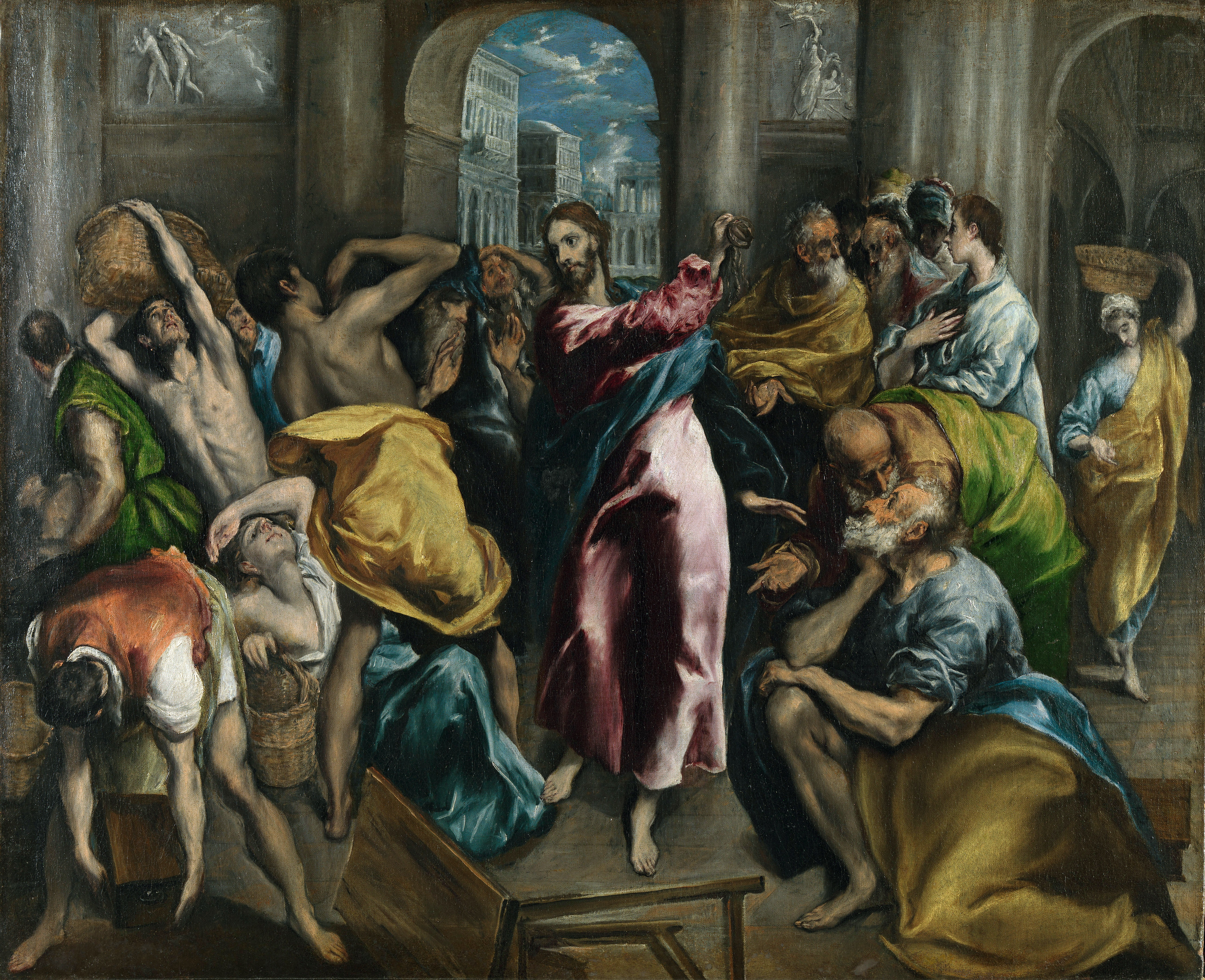
El Greco, Christ Driving the Traders from the Temple, (1600)

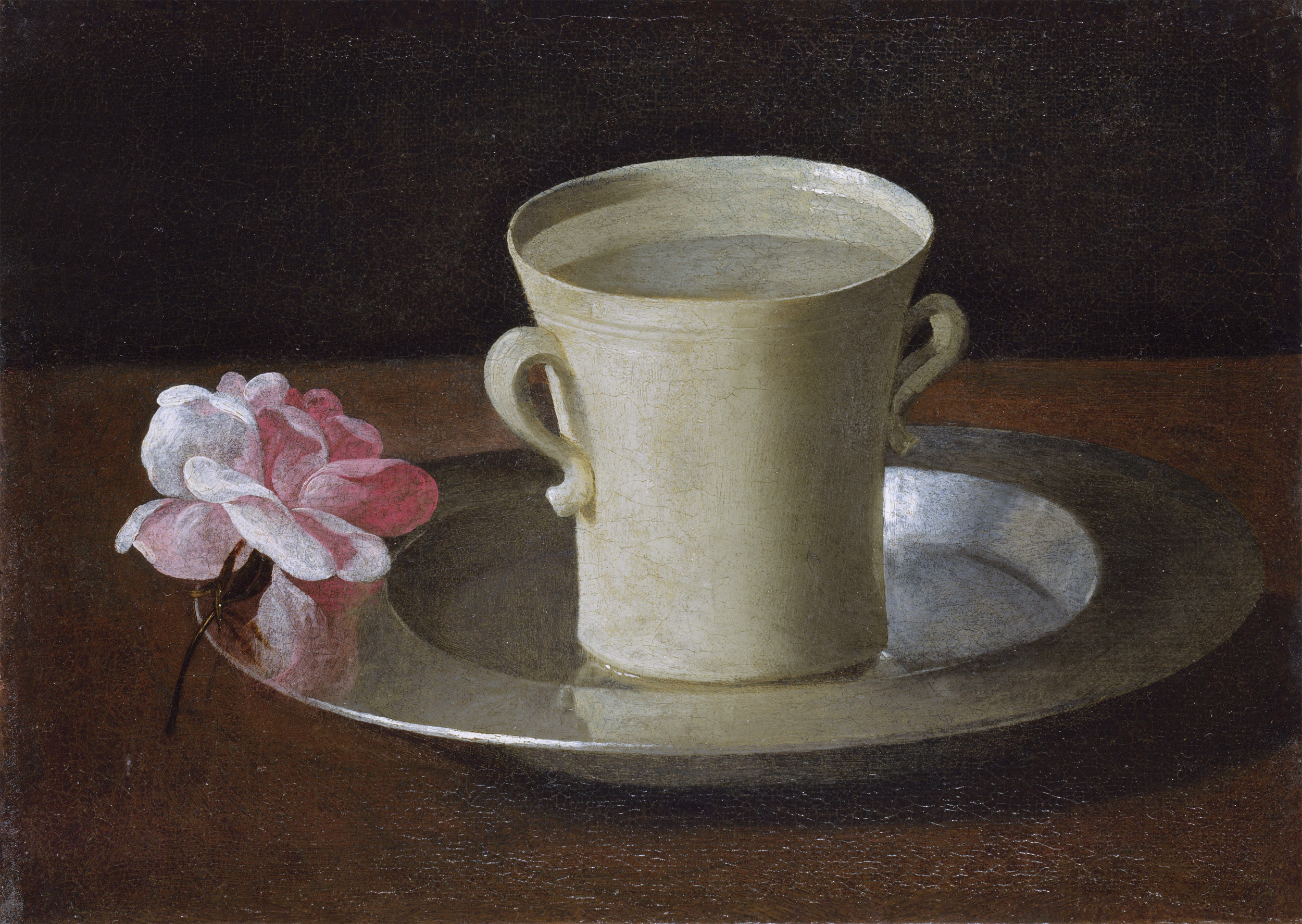
Francisco de Zurbarán, Cup of Water and a Rose on a Silver Plate, c. (1630)

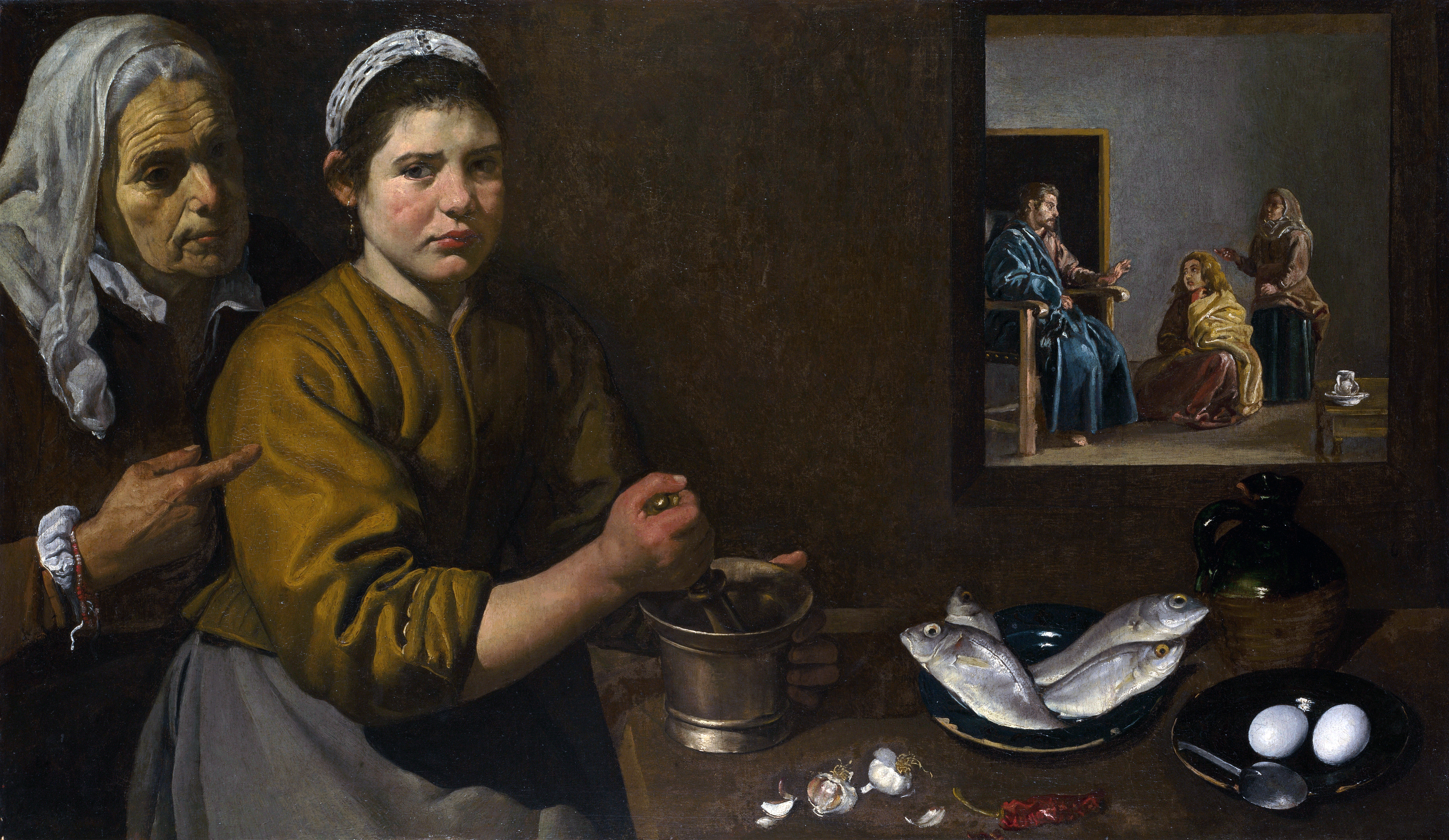
Diego Velázquez, Christ in the House of Martha and Mary, (1618)

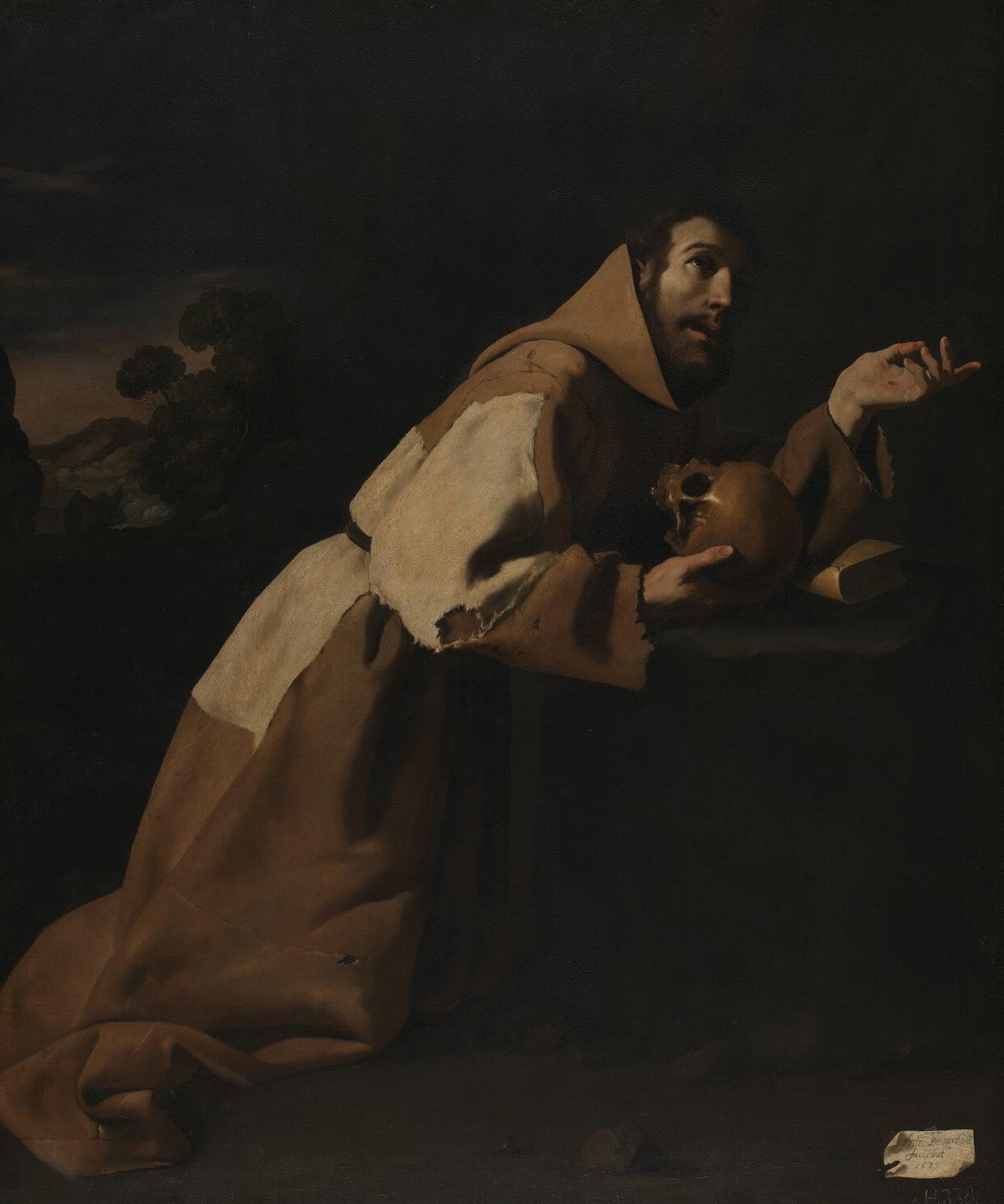
Francisco de Zurbarán, Saint Francis in Meditation (1639) of Martha and Mary, (1618)

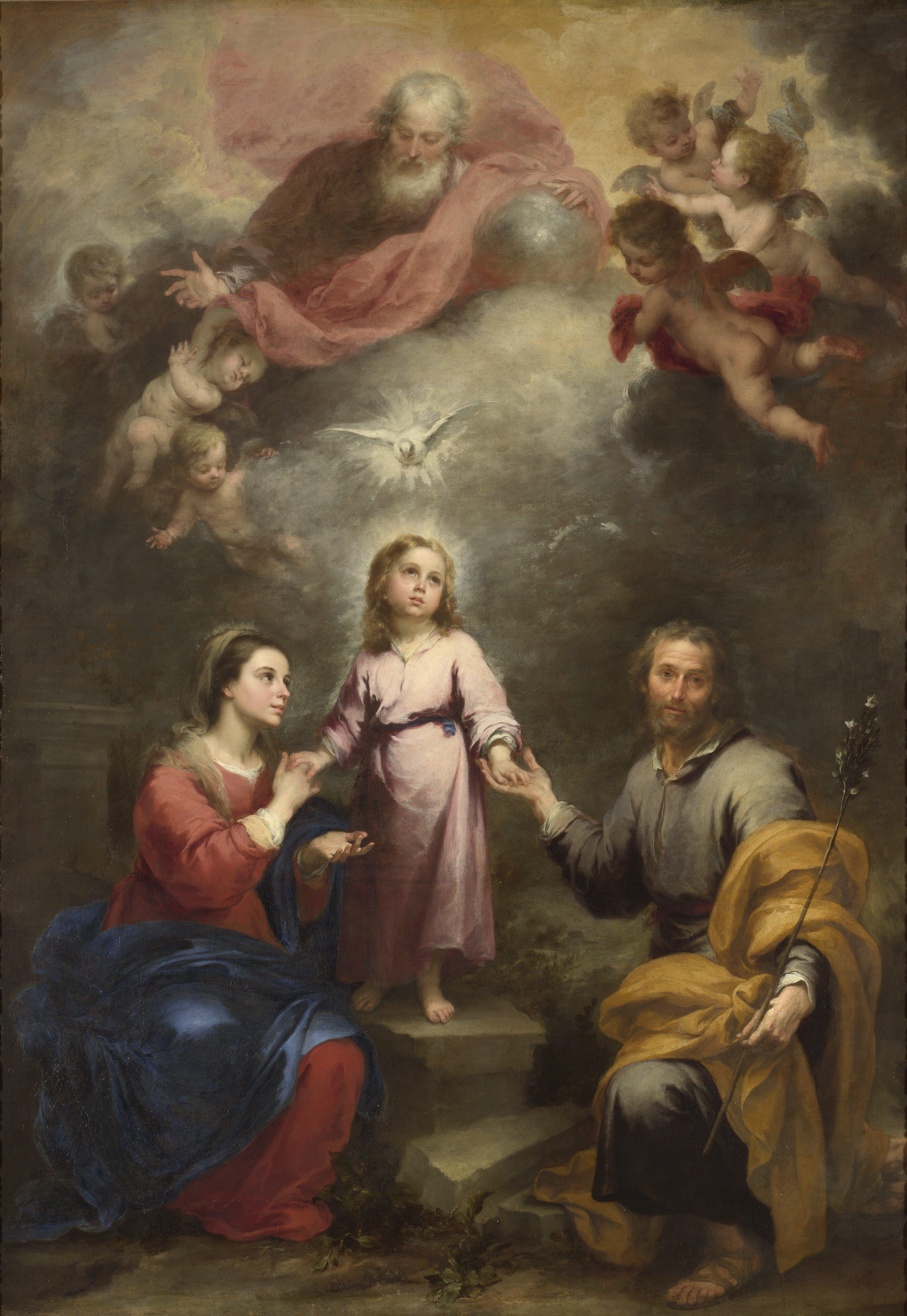
Bartolomé Esteban Murillo, The Heavenly and Earthly Trinities, (The Pedroso Murillo) (1675–82)

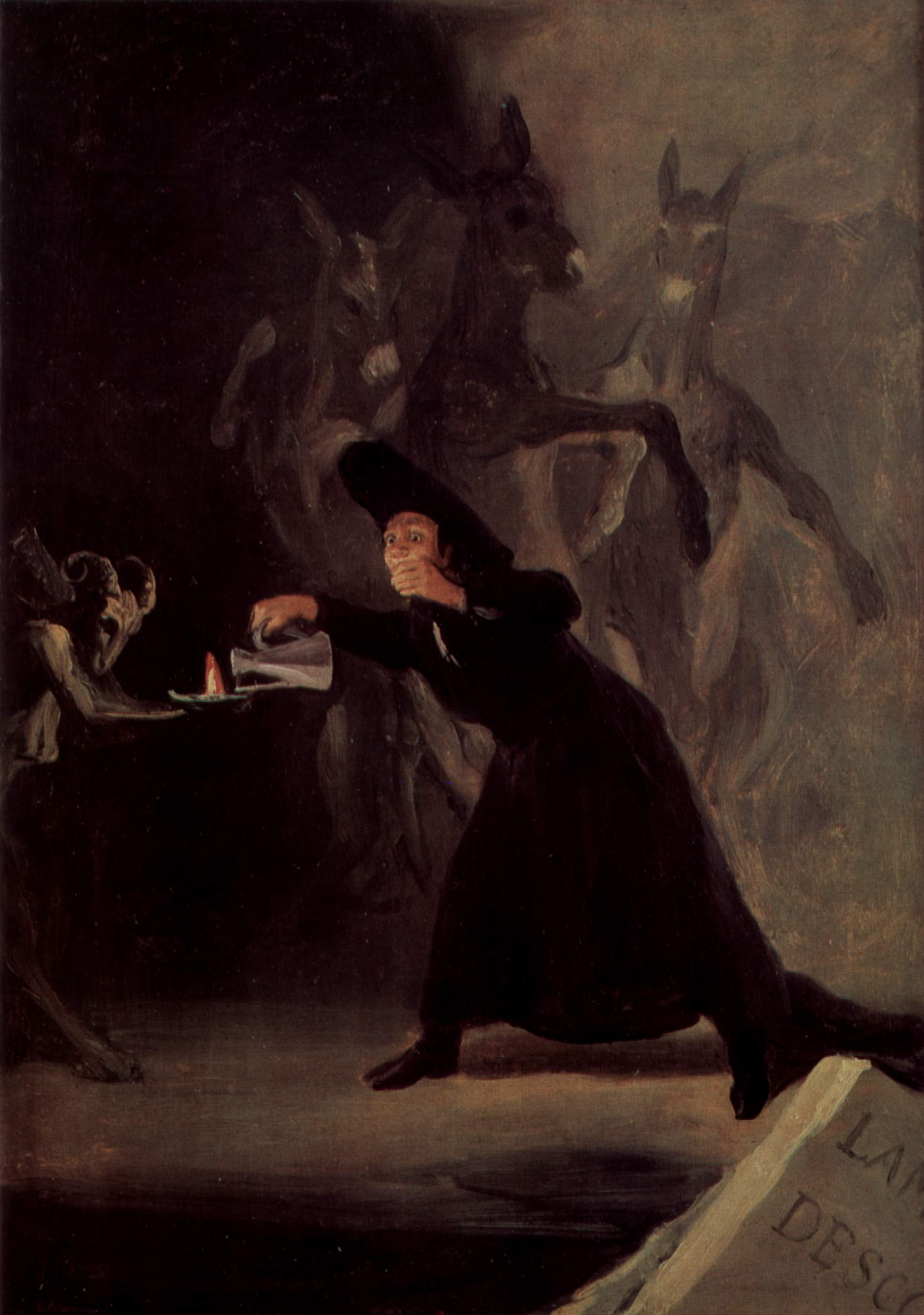
Francisco Goya, The Lamp of the Devil, (1797-1798)

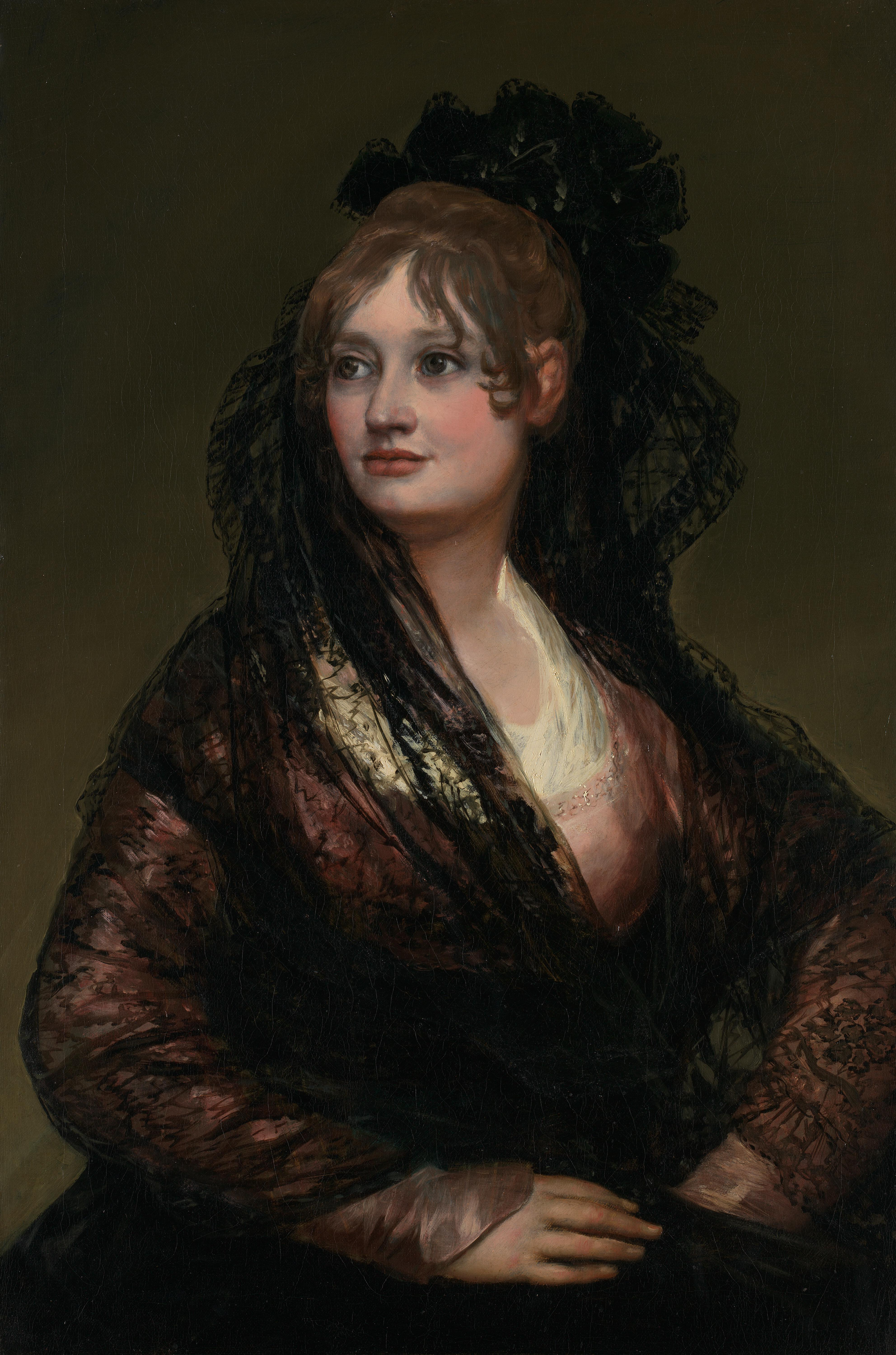
Francisco Goya, Portrait of Doña Isabel de Porcel, (1805)

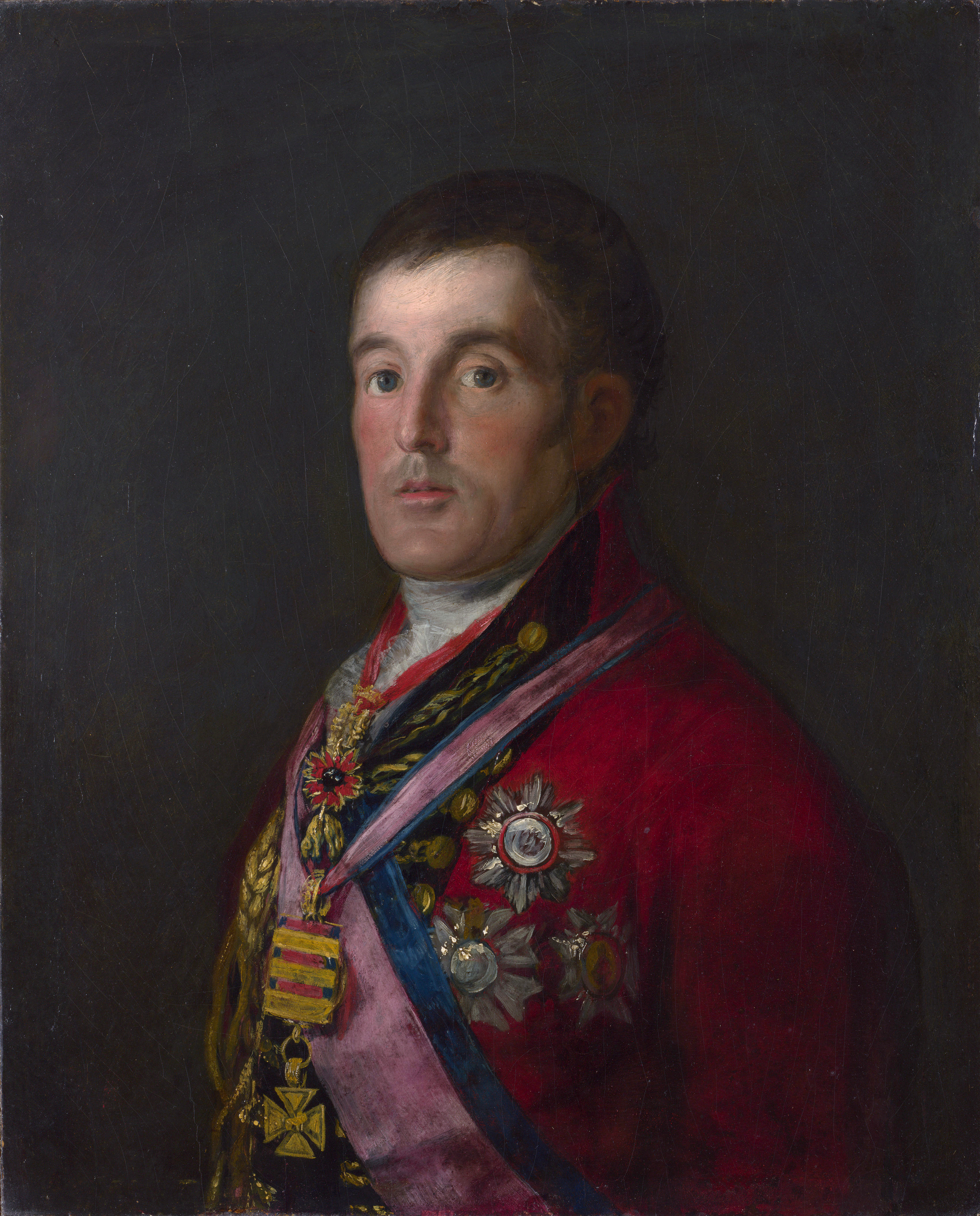
Francisco Goya, Portrait of the Duke of Wellington, 1812–14
