= François Le Vau =

French architect

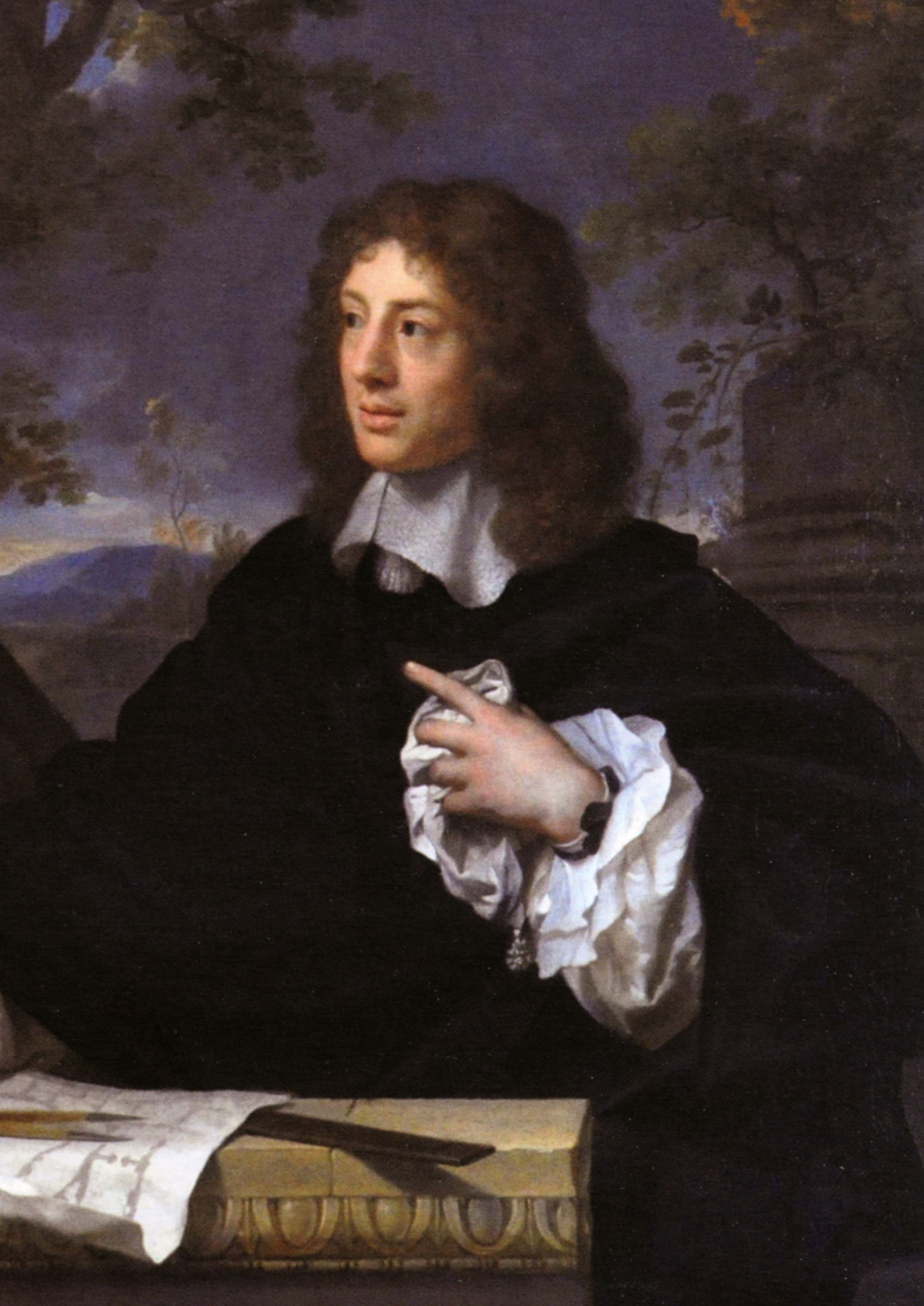
- Presumed portrait of François Le Vau (detail from a portrait with his father)
- Born: François Le Veau; 1624
- Died: 4 July 1676; Paris
- Occupation: architect
- Notable work: Interior courtyard of the Château de Saint-Fargeau; Château de Bercy; Château de Lignières (Cher); Project for the east facade of the Louvre

François Le Vau (French pronunciation: [fʁɑ̃swa lə vo]; 1624 – 4 July 1676) was a French architect and a founding member of the Académie Royale d'Architecture (established in 1671). He is also known for being the youngest brother of the more famous French architect, Louis Le Vau.

== Early life and training ==
Born François Le Veau, he was the youngest son of Louis Le Veau, a mason who died in February 1661, and Étiennette Louette, who died in December 1644. In the late 1630s and early 1640s, François trained with his older brother Louis, and both brothers worked together with their father, building houses on the Île Saint-Louis. In 1638 his brother Louis changed the spelling of his surname to Le Vau to avoid the lower-class stigma of "Le Veau" ("the calf"). François followed suit several years later. All his life François worked in the shadow of his brother Louis, who was very successful, becoming Premier Architecte du Roi after the death of Jacques Lemercier in 1654.

== Early career ==
François Le Vau is described as "architecq Ingenieur du Roy" in 1648, suggesting he may also have been involved in designing fortifications. He began working more independently of his brother around the time of the Fronde (1648–1653), when he became an architect in the Bâtiments du Roi and the architect of a participant in the Fronde, Anne Marie Louise d'Orléans, Duchess of Montpensier. He designed her apartments in the Tuileries Palace (before 1652; destroyed); remodeled the interior courtyard and her apartment in her Château de Saint-Fargeau (1652–1657; restored after a fire in 1752), where she resided during her exile; and later remodeled her apartments in the Palais du Luxembourg (1662; destroyed).

He also worked for other Frondeurs, "supporters of the losing side who were slipping into political obscurity." He designed and added apartments for the townhouses of Maximilien de Béthune, Duke of Sully (Hôtel de Sully; 1651); Louis de La Rivière (Hôtel de La Rivière on the Place Royale; 1652); and Armand-Charles de la Porte, Duke of La Meilleraye (in the Arsenal de Paris, begun 1654; destroyed).

He also designed for high-level government officials: for Jérôme de Nouveau, Grand Maître des Postes, he rebuilt the Château de Lignières (Cher) (1654–1660); for Jean-Baptiste Colbert, he modernised the Château de Seignelay (begun 1658; demolished 1798–1815); for Charles-Henry de Malon, he designed the Château de Bercy (after 1658–c. 1668; destroyed during the Second Empire); for Charles de Sainte-Maure, Duke of Montausier, he made modifications to the Château de Rambouillet (begun 1659); and for Louis de Rochechouart, he created the Montpipaux project. He has also been credited with the design of the Château de Sucy-en-Brie (begun 1660) for Nicolas Lambert (who in 1644 had inherited from his brother Jean-Baptiste the Hôtel Lambert, built by Louis Le Vau in 1640–1644).

At some point in this part of his career, François Le Vau visited Rome, probably before 1662–1663, when he joined the office of Bridges and Roads.

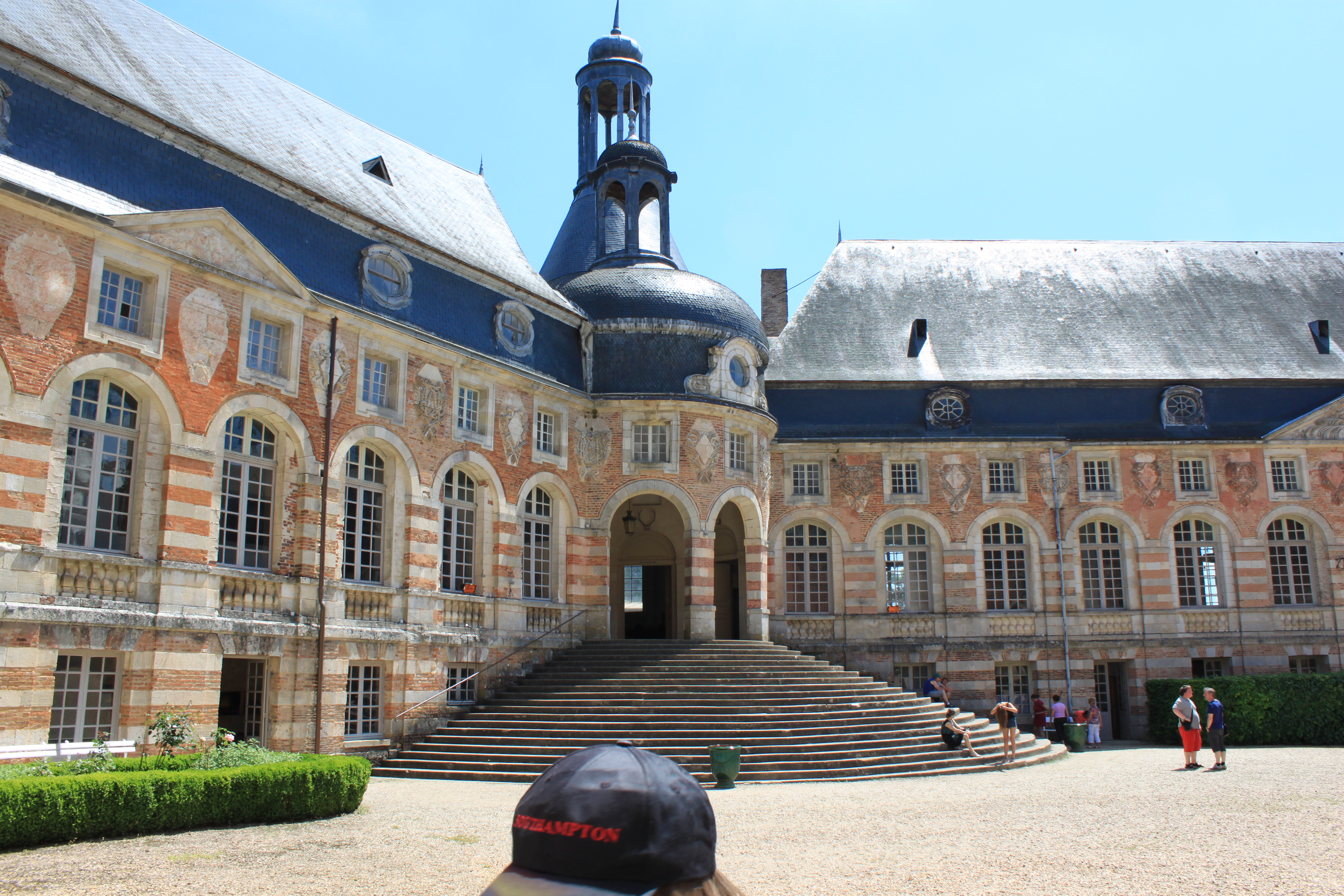
Interior courtyard of the Château de Saint-Fargeau (1652–1657)

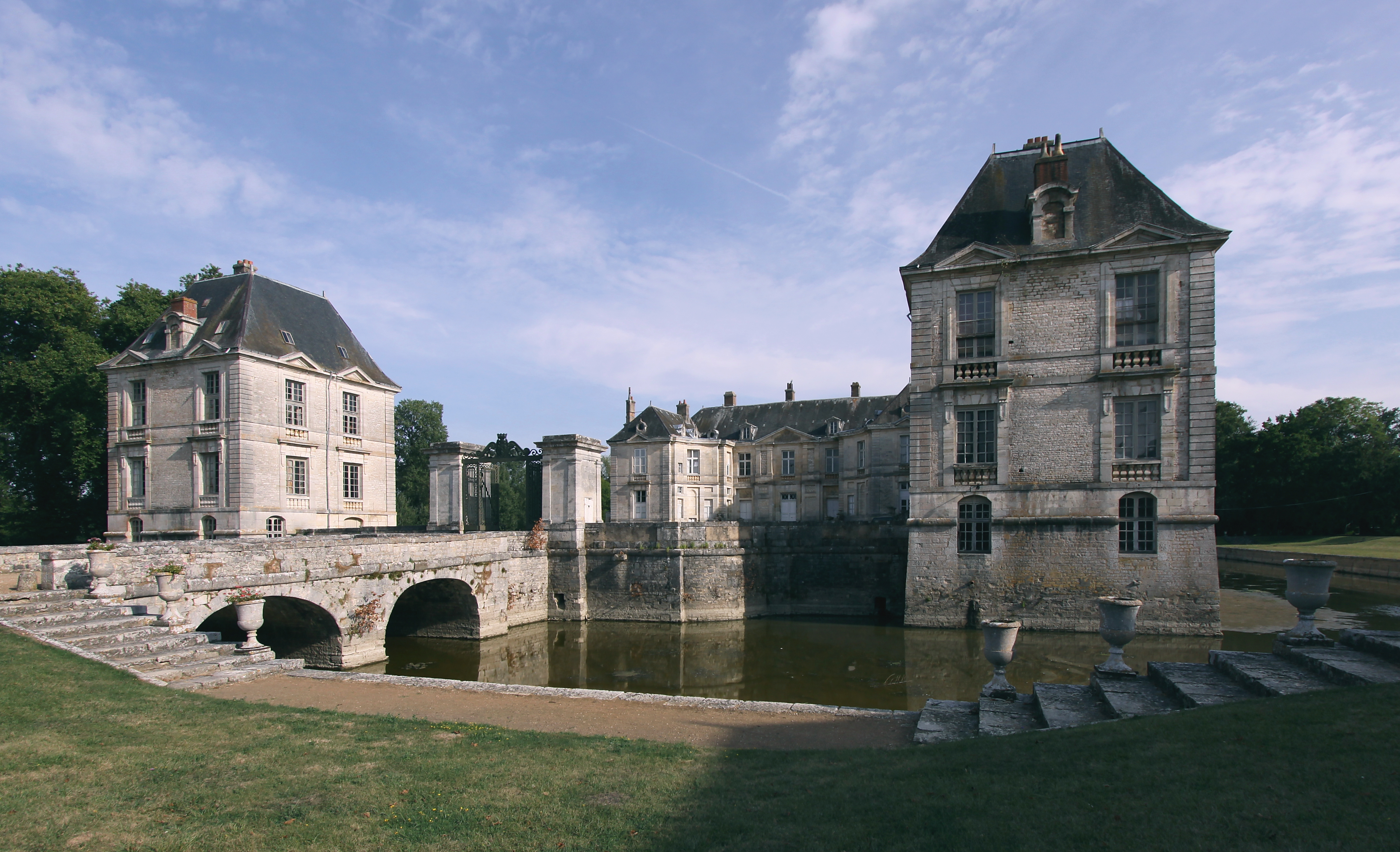
Entrance front of the Château de Lignières (Cher) (1654–1660)

== Work for Colbert ==
In 1662, François Le Vau began to work in the royal office of the Ponts et Chaussées (Bridges and Roads) under Louis XIV's minister Jean-Baptiste Colbert. This work continued until 1673.

=== Project for the east façade of the Louvre ===
Around the end of 1662, Colbert asked François Le Vau to prepare a design for the east facade of the Louvre, which François offered to present to Colbert in a letter of 4 December 1664. A large presentation drawing (Nationalmuseum, Stockholm; undated) and several engravings of designs by François, one by Isaac Durant and several by Claude Olry de Loriande, have been identified by several architectural historians as belonging to the project described in the letter of December 1664. The design is similar to the scheme that was eventually adopted in many important respects, in particular a trabeated, free-standing colonnade of coupled columns raised above the ground floor. The drawing shows two alternatives for an attic story (omitted as executed), with arched windows on the left (matching those of Pierre Lescot's Pavillon du Roi) and rectangular windows on the right.

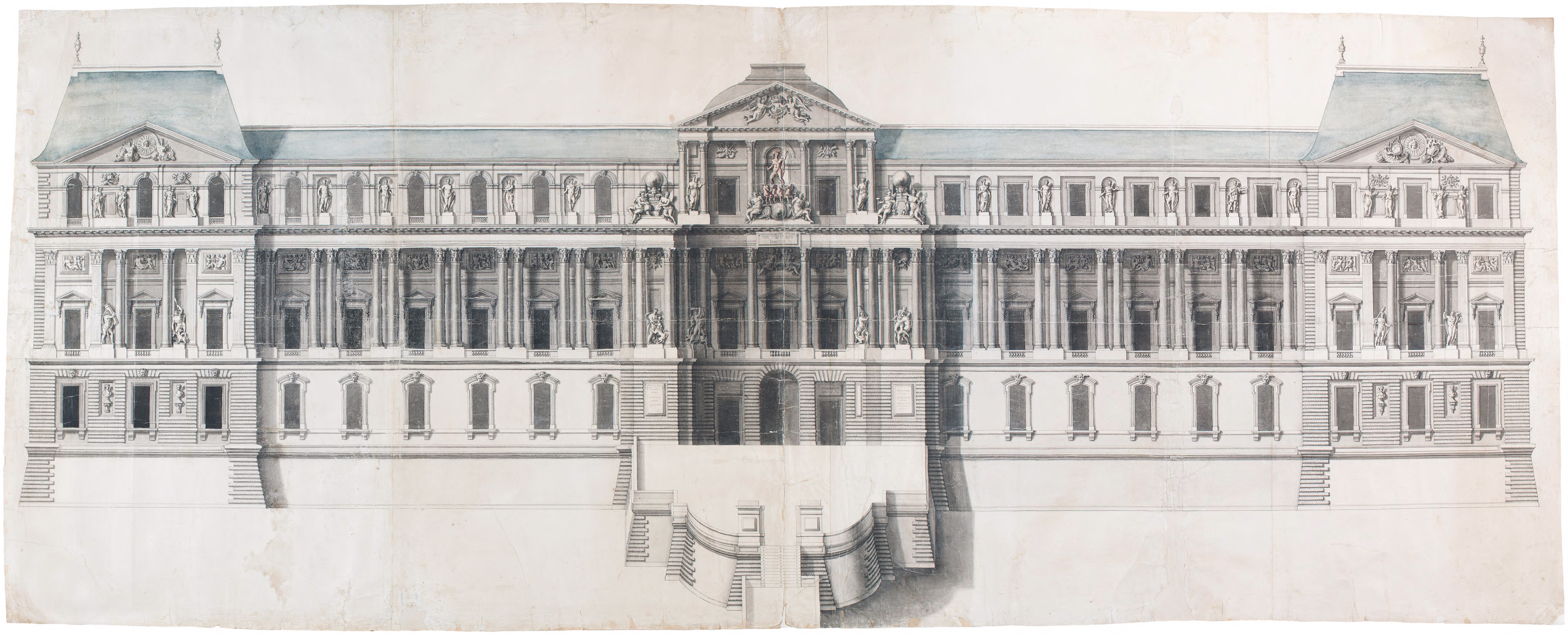
Drawing of an unexecuted project for the east façade of the Louvre by François Le Vau, which may be his proposal of 1664

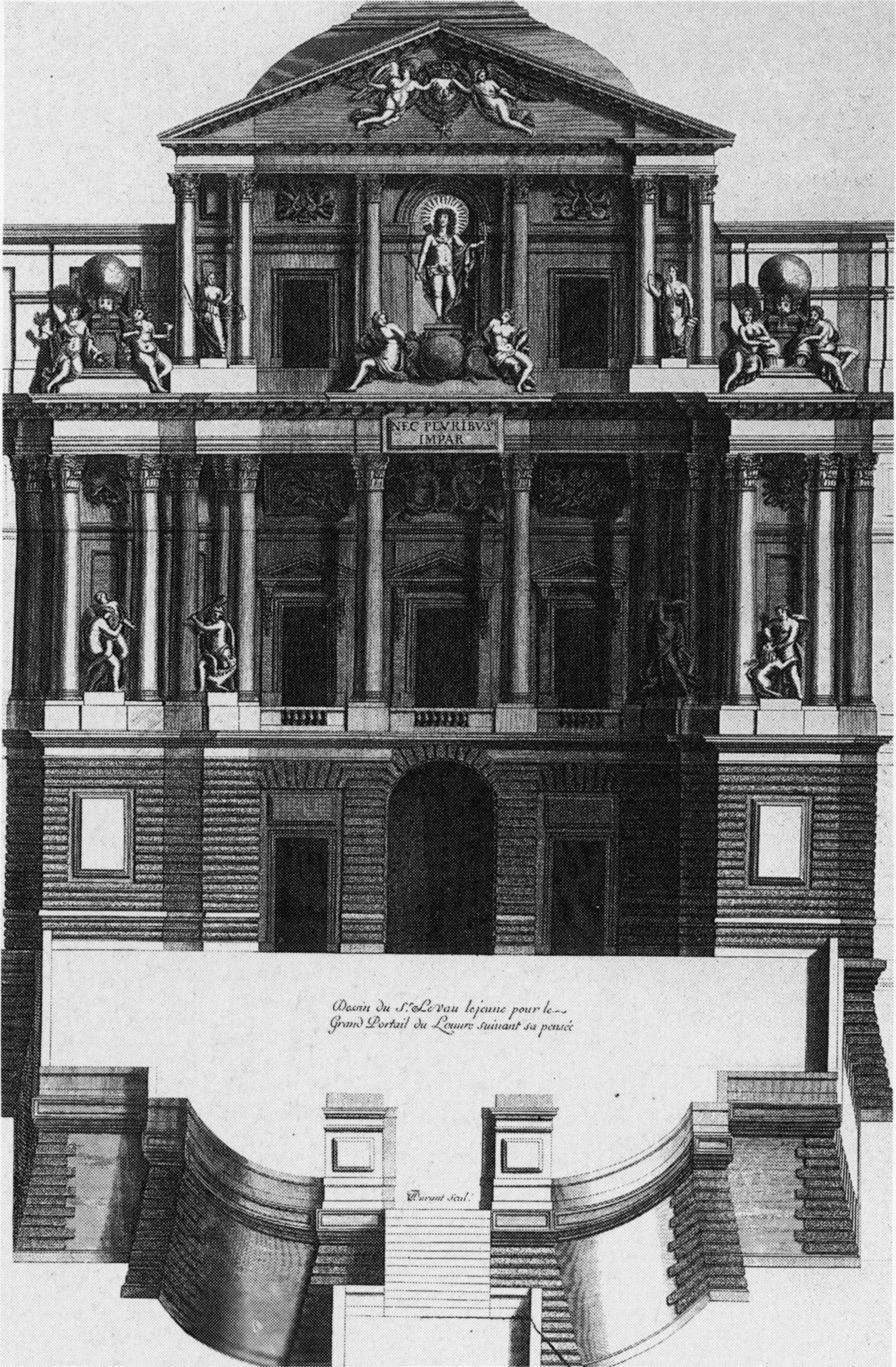
Design for the central pavilion, engraved by Isaac Durant

The dating of François Le Vau's Louvre project to 1662–1664 has been disputed by some authors, who suggest it was actually created sometime after 14 May 1667, when Louis XIV selected the colonnaded design proposed to him by the Petit Conseil, but before the decision to double the width of the south wing in the spring of 1668. Claude Perrault's brother Charles Perrault claimed in his memoirs that Claude was the sole author of the colonnade design.

In 1670, when much of the facade was substantially completed, Olry de Loriande published a poem, Le superbe dessein du Louvre, in which, according to the architectural historian Robert W. Berger, he credits François Le Vau with the design. It begins with the following lines:

O Palace, the most attractive in the universe,
True miracle of art, worthy of the most beautiful verses,
Since the profound wisdom of the great Colbert
Destines you to be a masterpiece of the world,
And since according to the designs of the famous Le Vau,
I have engraved your marvelous picture on copper;
I want to portray you anew in this book,
Since my hand knows the arts of engraving and writing.

== Late career ==
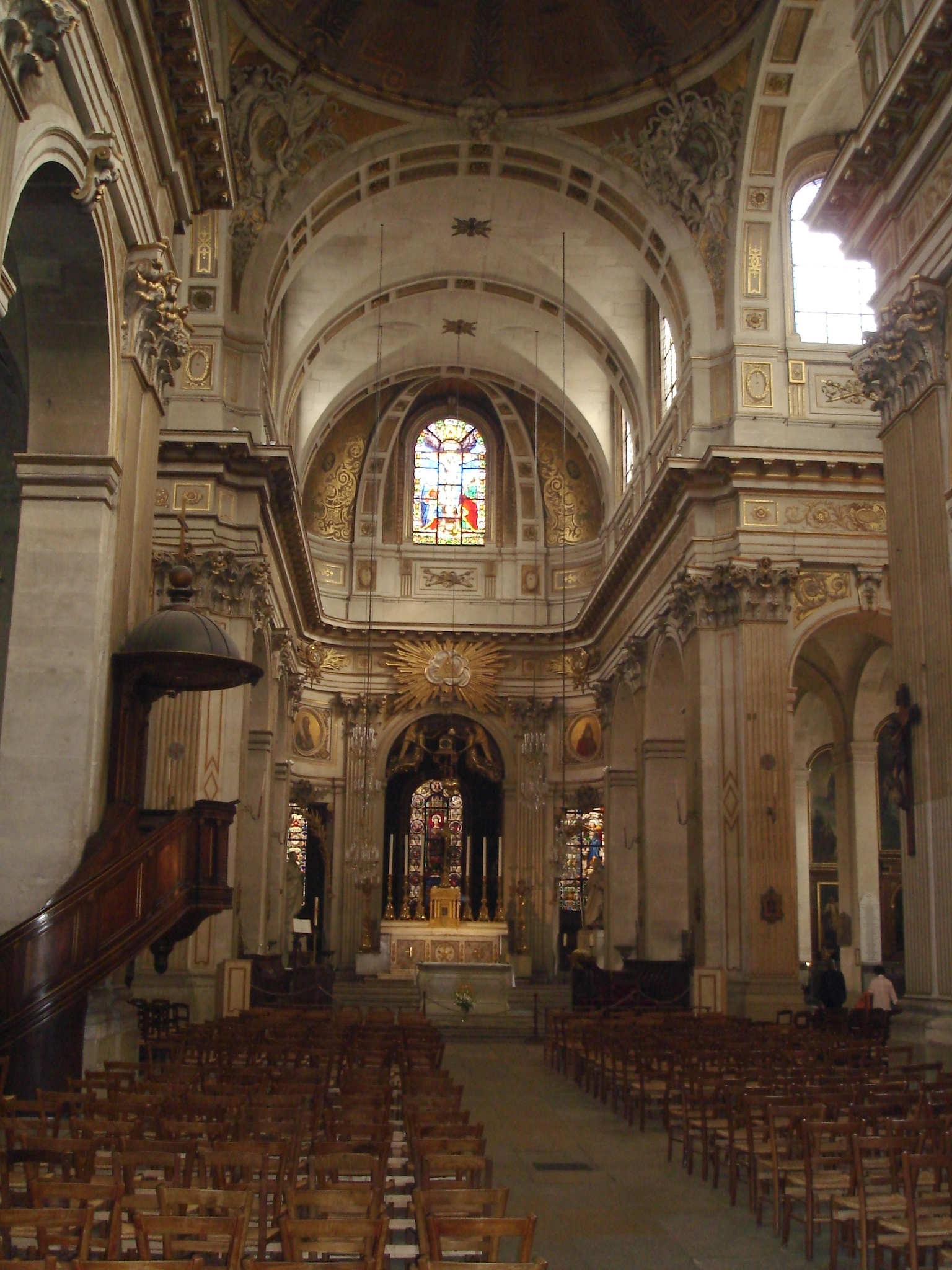
Interior of the Église Saint-Louis-en-l'Île (begun 1664)

It is now thought that François Le Vau created the initial designs for the Église Saint-Louis-en-l'Île, formerly attributed to Louis Le Vau. Begun in 1664, only the sanctuary and part of the choir had been completed at the time of François's death in 1676. Further construction was carried out by Gabriel Le Duc. In 1667 François created a project for the south portal of the transept of the Cathédrale d'Orléans.

In 1664–1665, according to the Comptes des Bâtiments, François Le Vau received an "exceptional" salary of 3,467 livres, as well as 1,000 livres per year as an architect in the Bâtiments du Roi. In 1671, he became one of the eight founding members of the Académie Royale d'Architecture (created by Louis XIV), for which he was paid an additional 500 livres per year.

On 15 July 1675 the members of the Académie Royale d'Architecture gathered in the church of the Collège des Quatre-Nations to consider three alternative locations for Cardinal Mazarin's tomb: centered under the dome (as originally intended by Louis Le Vau, the architect of the Collège); in the altar on the right side; or in a niche in the far (west) wall, opposite the courtyard entrance. In March 1676 they submitted their opinions (avis). François was one of the majority opposing a location under the dome, because, as he put it, "this church is not a mausoleum, like the Valois Chapel", thus disagreeing with the premise of his brother's design and (according to the architectural historian Hilary Ballon) "giving vent to rivalrous feelings that evidently outlasted Louis's lifetime."

François Le Vau died at his residence (today 49, quai de Bourbon) at the western tip of the Île-Saint-Louis in Paris.

== Bibliography ==
- Babelon, Jean-Pierre (1976). "Le château de Sucy-en-Brie, oeuvre de François Le Vau," Bulletin de la Société de l'histoire de Paris et de l'Île-de-France, vol. 101–102 (1974–1975), pp. 83–102. ISSN 1148-7968. OCLC 834640332.
- Ballon, Hilary (1999). Louis Le Vau: Mazarin's Collège, Colbert's Revenge. Princeton: Princeton University Press. ISBN 9780691048956.
- Berger, Robert W. (1970). "Charles Le Brun and the Louvre Colonnade", The Art Bulletin, vol. 52, no. 4 (December), pp. 394–403. JSTOR 3048766.
- Berger, Robert W. (1982). "Le Vau, François", vol. 2, p. 695, in Macmillan Encyclopedia of Architects, 4 volumes, edited by Adolf K. Placzek. London: The Free Press. ISBN 9780029250006.
- Berger, Robert W. (1993). The Palace of the Sun: The Louvre of Louis XIV. University Park: The Pennsylvania State University Press. ISBN 9780271008479.
- Berger, Robert W. (1994). A Royal Passion: Louis XIV as Patron of Architecture. Cambridge: Cambridge University Press. ISBN 0521440297.
- Berger, Robert W.; Tadgell, Christopher (1995). Letters concerning Tadgell's review of Berger 1993. Journal of the Society of Architectural Historians, vol. 54, no. 2 (June), p. 265. JSTOR 990988.
- Blunt, Anthony (1957). Art and Architecture in France, 1500–1700, 2d rearranged impression. Middlesex: Hammondworth. OCLC 154127713, 912126240.
- Blunt, Anthony; Beresford, Richard (1999). Art and Architecture in France, 1500–1700, 5th edition. New Haven, Connecticut: Yale University Press. ISBN 9780300077483.
- Cojannot, Alexandre (2003). "Claude Perrault et le Louvre de Louis XIV. À propos de deux livres récents", Bulletin Monumental, vol. 161, no. 3, pp. 231–239.
- Cojannot, Alexandre (2012). Louis Le Vau et les nouvelles ambitions de l'architecture française 1612–1654. Paris: Picard. ISBN 9782708409361.
- Dumolin, Maurice (1931). Études topographie parisienne. Tome III, "La Construction de l'île Saint-Louis", pp. 1–288. Paris: Auguste Picard. OCLC 313298127, 930440137.
- Feldmann, Dietrich (1996). "Le Vau", vol. 19, pp. 262–268, in The Dictionary of Art, 34 volumes, edited by Jane Turner. New York: Grove. ISBN 9781884446009. Also available at Oxford Art Online (subscription required).
- Felkay, Nicole (1983). "François Le Vau 1623 ?–1676", pp. 264–265, in Colbert 1619–1683, exhibition catalog. Paris: Ministère de la Culture. OCLC 10588912.
- Gargiani, Roberto (1998). Idea e costruzione del Louvre. Parigi cruciale nella storia dell'architettura moderna europea. Florence: Alinea. ISBN 8881252538.
- Hautecoeur, Louis (1924). "L'auteur de la colonnade du Louvre". Gazette des Beaux-Arts, series 5, vol. 9, pp. 151–168. Copy at Gallica.
- Hautecoeur, Louis (1927). L'histoire des châteaux du Louvre et des Tuileries, tels qu'ils furent nouvellement construits, amplifiés, embellis, sous le règne de Sa Majesté le Roi Louis XIV, dit le Grand... Paris and Brussels: Librairie Nationale d'Art et d'Histoire, G. Van Oest. OCLC 1748382.
- Hautecoeur, Louis (1948). Histoire de l'Architecture classique en France. Tome 2: Le Règne de Louis XIV. Paris: J. Picard. OCLC 489711032, 476619163.
- Jal, Auguste (1867). Dictionnaire critique de biographie et d'histoire: errata et supplément pour tous les dictionnaires historiques, "Le Vau", pp. 785–788. Paris: Henri Plon. Title page at Google Books. 2nd expanded and corrected edition (1872) at Gallica.
- Laprade, Albert (1960). François d'Orbay: Architecte de Louis XIV. Paris: Éditions Vincent, Fréal. OCLC 562063179, 780531730, 1096782.
- Middleton, Robin (1993). Review of Berger 1993. The Burlington Magazine, vol. 135, no. 1087 (October), pp. 701–702. JSTOR 885745.
- Neuman, Robert (2013). Baroque and Rococo Art and Architecture. Boston: Pearson. ISBN 9780205832262.
- Pérouse de Montclos, Jean-Marie (1989). Histoire de l'architecture française. De la Renaissance à la Révolution. Paris: Mengès. ISBN 2856203000.
- Pérouse de Montclos, Jean-Marie (1994). Le Guide du patrimoine. Paris. Paris: Hachette. OCLC 30973704. ISBN 9782010168123.
- Petzet, Michael (2000). Claude Perrault und die Architektur des Sonnenkönigs. Der Louvre König Ludwigs XIV. und das Werk Claude Perraults. Munich/Berlin: Deutscher Kunstverlag. ISBN 3422062645.
- Picon, Antoine (1988). Claude Perrault, 1613–1688. Paris: Picard. ISBN 9782858220816.
- Tadgell, Christopher (1980). "Claude Perrault, François Le Vau and the Louvre Colonnade", The Burlington Magazine, vol. 122, no. 926 (May), pp. 326–337. JSTOR 879970.
- Tadgell, Christopher (1994). Review of Berger 1993. Journal of the Society of Architectural Historians, vol. 53, no. 4 (December), pp. 489–491. JSTOR 990926.
