= Château de Lignières (Cher) =

Château in Lignières, Cher, France

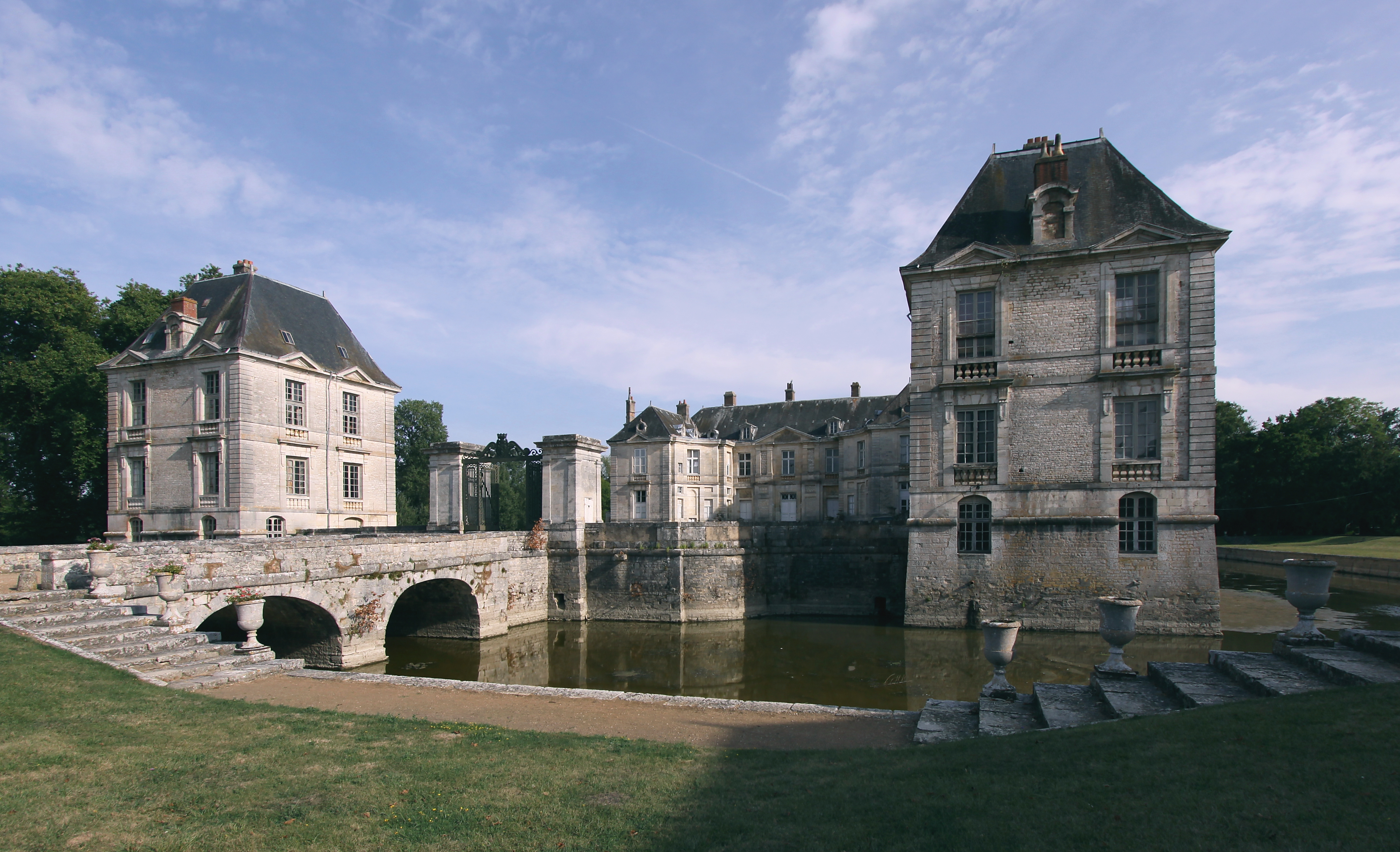
- View of the entrance front

- Location within France

General information
- Architectural style: Classical
- Location: Lignières (Cher), France
- Coordinates: 46.75007°N 2.17905°E
- Construction started: 1654
- Owner: Prince Sixtus Henry of Bourbon-Parma

Design and construction
- Architect: François Le Vau

The Château de Lignières is a French château, located in the municipality of Lignières, in the département of Cher. It was built in 1654–1660 for the financier Jérôme de Nouveau to the designs of the French architect François Le Vau. It was designated a monument historique on 27 June 1935.

== Design and construction ==
The feudal castle (château féodal) on the site was razed in 1653, and the property sold by Brichanteau to Jérome de Nouveau, Surintendant Général des Postes, who brought in the architect François Le Vau to design the new château. The contract was signed on 9 May 1654. Jérôme de Nouveau hired Michel [Le] Roy, a sculptor-contractor and master mason from Bourges, to supervise the work. François Le Vau constructed the new building on the foundations of the old and retained the old moat and its defensive wall (fausse braye). His designs for the château are preserved in four engravings by Claude Olry de Loriande.

The new corps de logis was built from 1654 to 1656. It was connected to two end pavilions by curved façades, similar to what architect François Mansart had done for the Château de Berny (1623) and his grand dessein for the Château de Blois (1635–1638), and which François Le Vau's older brother, the architect Louis Le Vau, would use later.

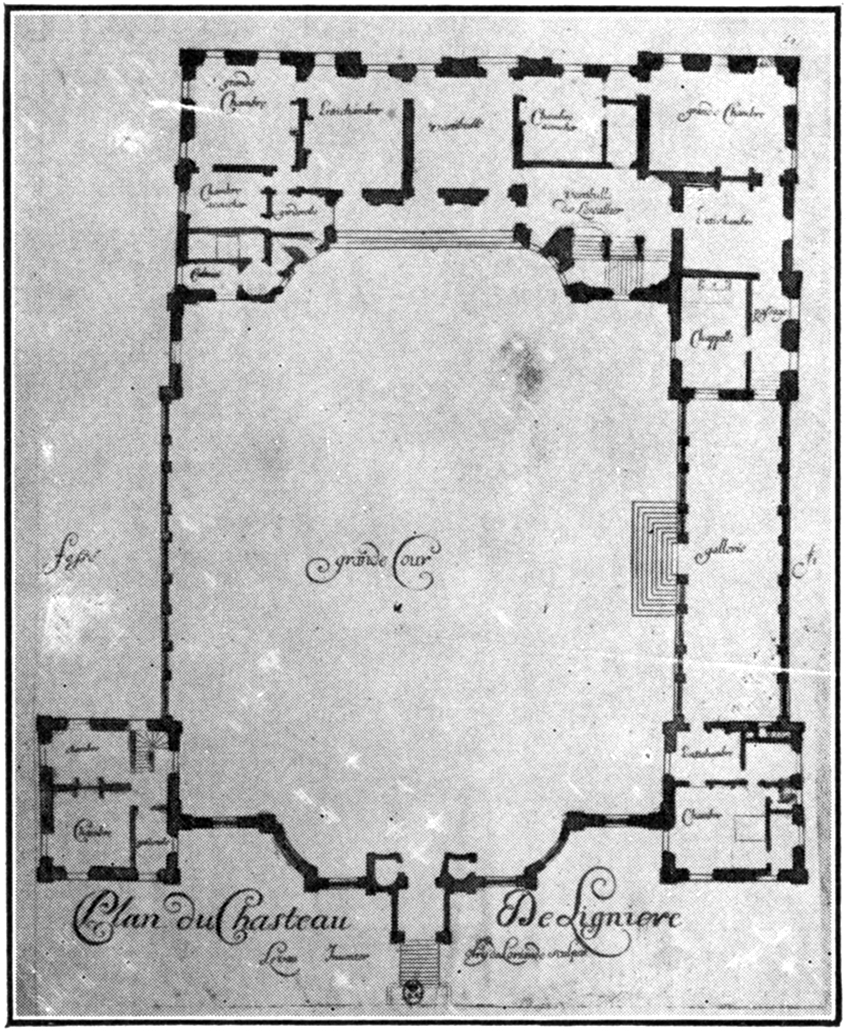
Architectural plan

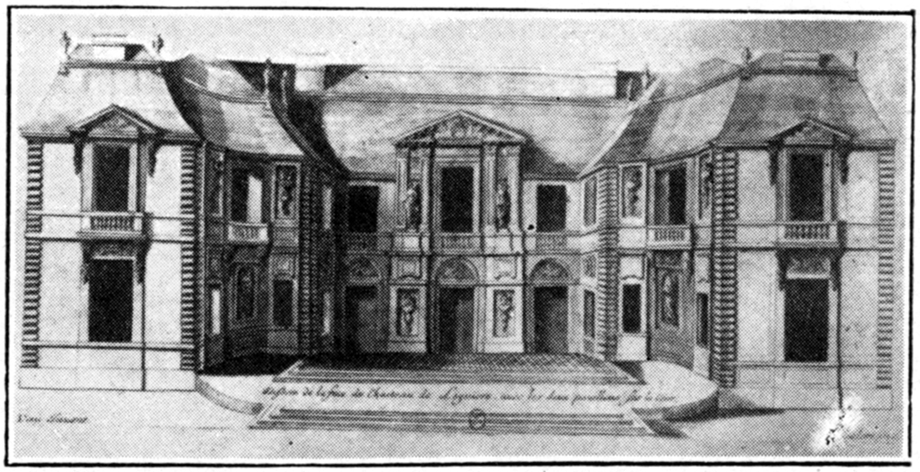
Courtyard elevation showing the curved connecting façades

== Bibliography ==
- Berger, Robert W. (1993). The Palace of the Sun: The Louvre of Louis XIV. University Park: The Pennsylvania State University Press. ISBN 9780271008479.
- Feldmann, Dietrich (1996). "Le Vau", vol. 19, pp. 262–268, in The Dictionary of Art, 34 volumes, edited by Jane Turner. New York: Grove. ISBN 9781884446009. Also available at Oxford Art Online (subscription required).
- Hautecoeur, Louis (1948). Histoire de l'Architecture classique en France. Tome 2: Le Règne de Louis XIV. Paris: J. Picard. OCLC 489711032, 476619163.
- Laprade, Albert (1960). François d'Orbay: Architecte de Louis XIV. Paris: Éditions Vincent, Fréal. OCLC 562063179, 780531730, 1096782.
