= Saint-Louis-en-l'Île =

Church of Saint-Louis en l'Île
- Église Saint-Louis en l'Île
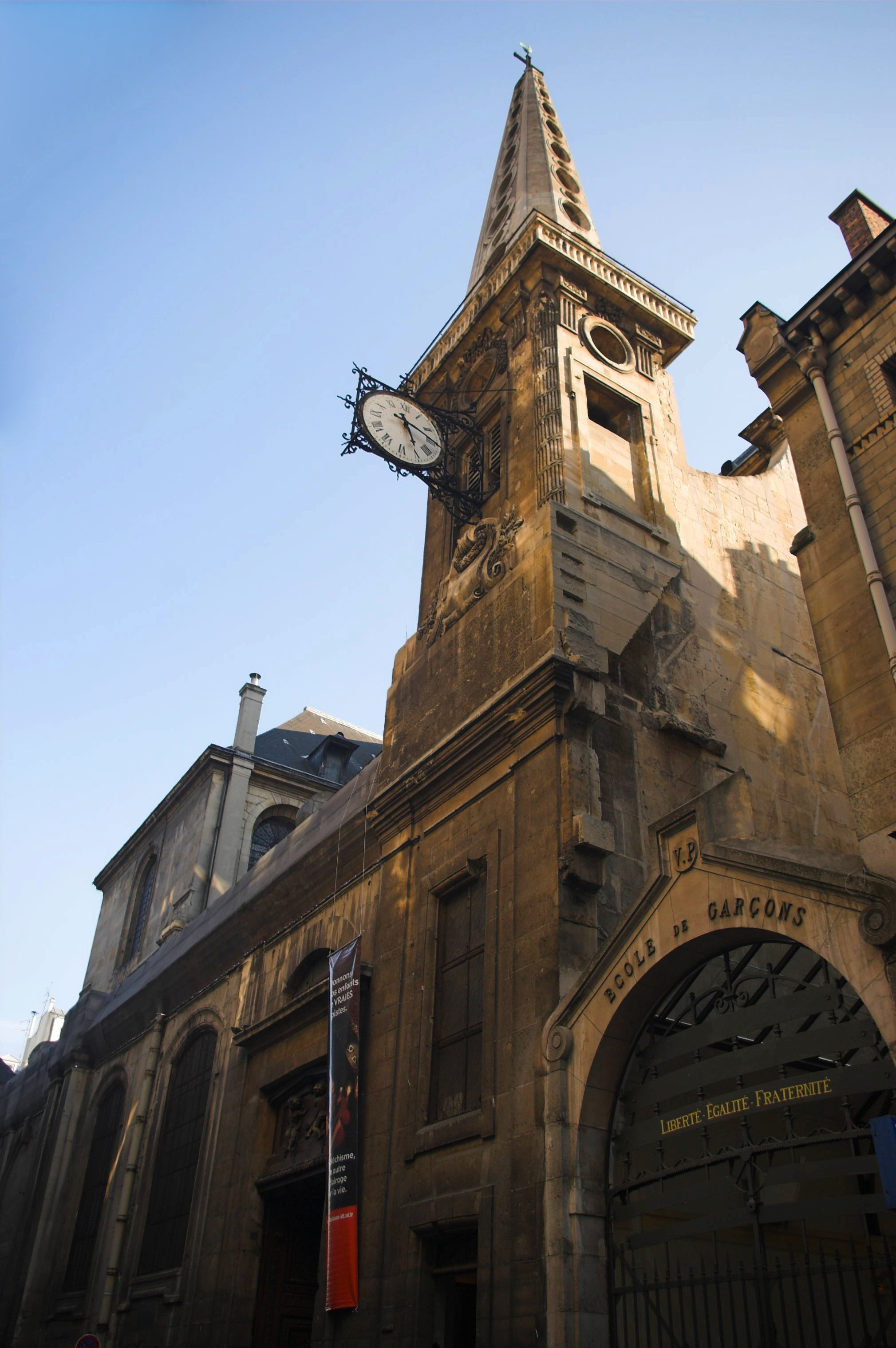
- Church of Saint-Louis en l'Île
- 48°51′05″N 2°21′27″E
- Location: 19 Rue Saint-Louis en l'Île, 4th arrondissement of Paris
- Country: France
- Denomination: Roman Catholic Church
- Website: www.saintlouisenlile.catholique.fr

History
- Status: Active

Architecture
- Architectural type: Church
- Groundbreaking: 1624
- Completed: 1726

Administration
- Archdiocese: Archdiocese of Paris

Monument historique
- Official name: Église Saint-Louis en l'Île
- Type: Église
- Designated: 1915
- Reference no.: PA00086258

Saint-Louis en l'Île (French pronunciation: [sɛ̃ lwi ɑ̃ l‿il] meaning "Saint Louis on the Island") is a Roman Catholic parish church located at 19 Rue Saint-Louis en l'Île on Île Saint-Louis in the 4th arrondissement of Paris, France. It was constructed between 1664 and 1725, and is dedicated to King Louis IX of France, or Saint Louis. The church was originally built in the French Baroque style of the 17th century, but much of the interior decoration was taken or destroyed in the French Revolution. The church was extensively restored and redecorated in the 19th century.

== History ==
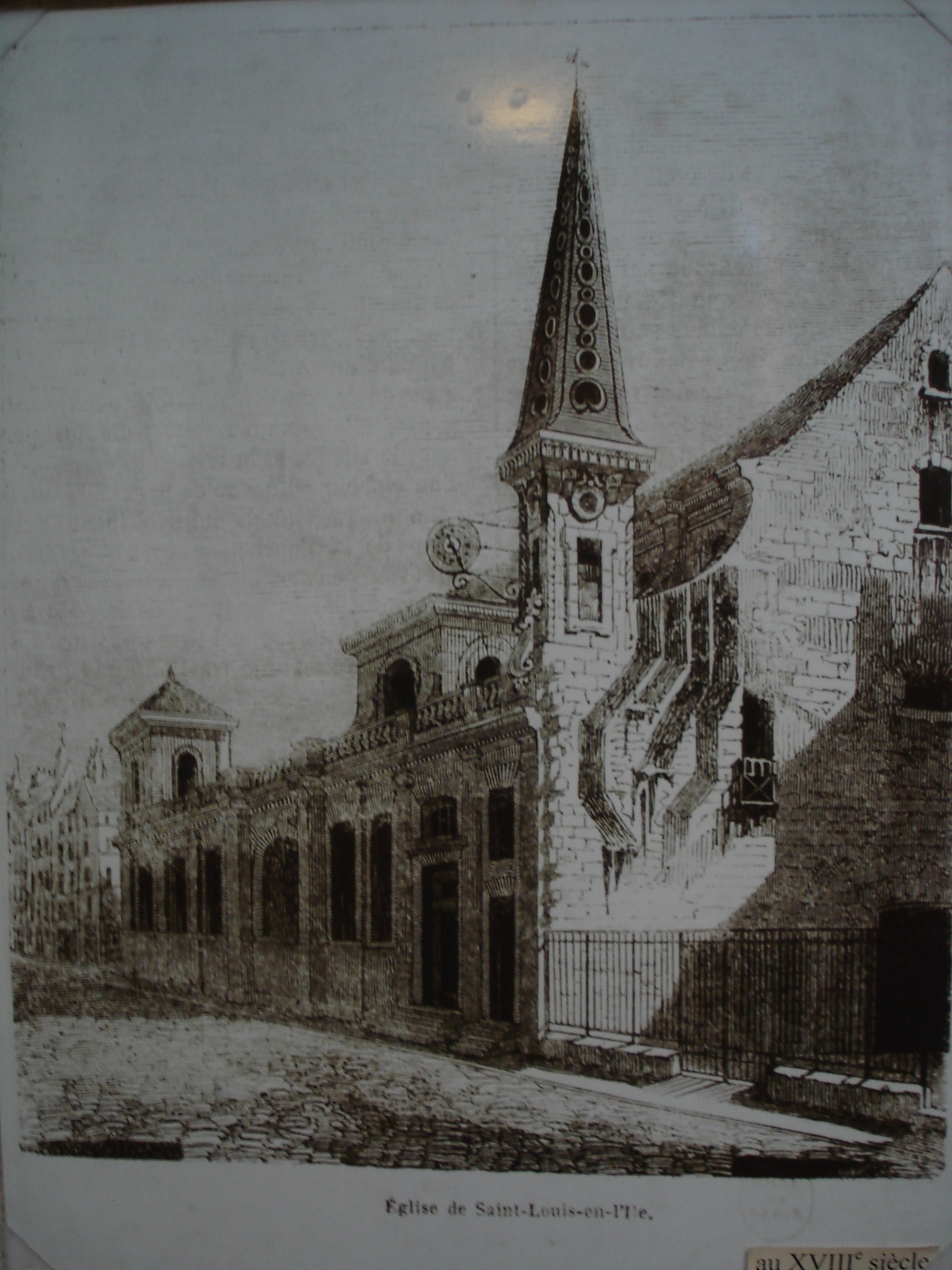
The church in the 18th century

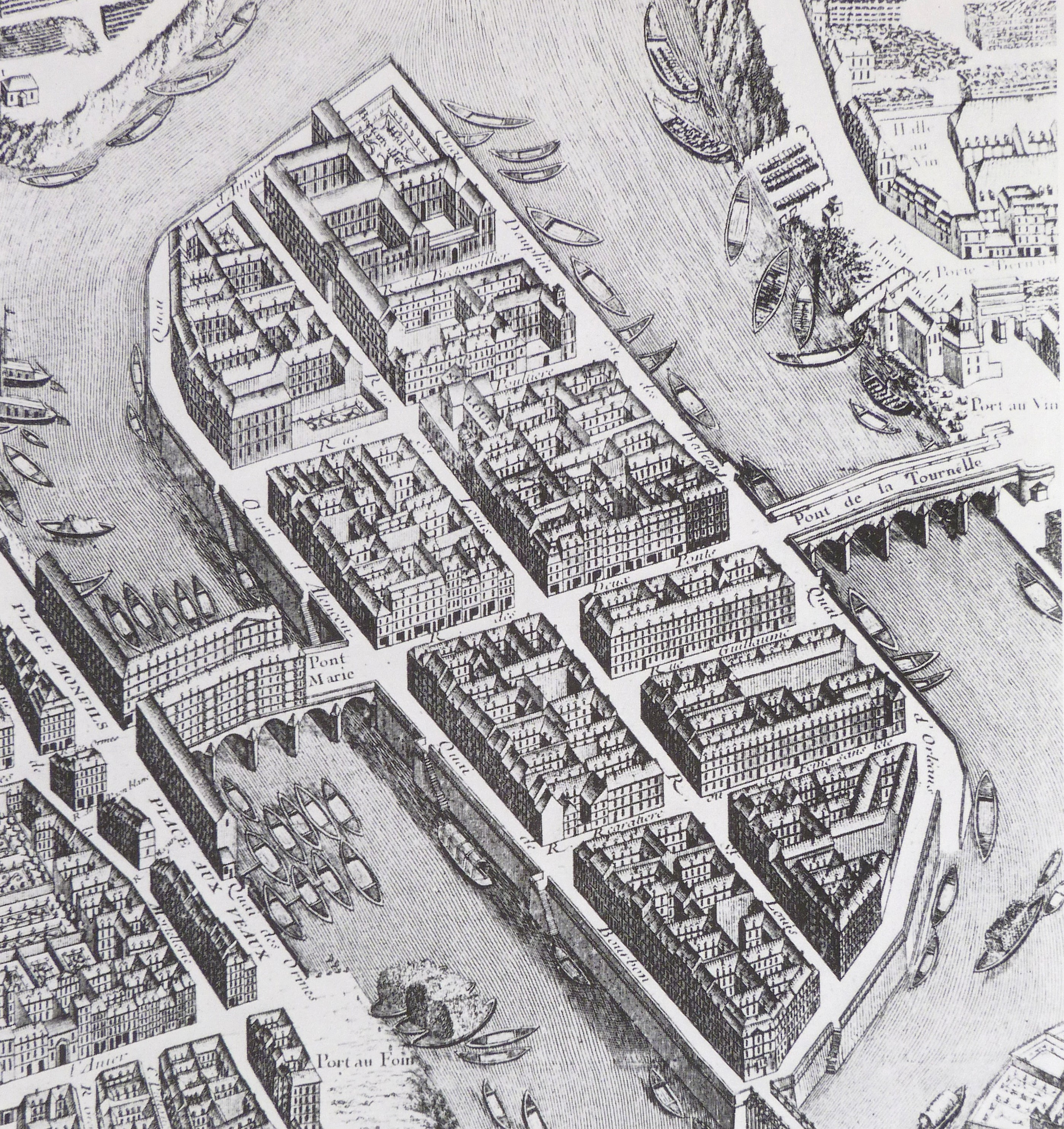
Turgot plan of Paris (1739) showing the church, middle top right

In the early 17th century the Île Saint-Louis was uninhabited. When the first houses were built on the island, a parish was created and the first chapel was constructed in 1623.

As the population of the island grew, a larger church was needed. The new church was designed by the architect François Le Vau (1613–1636), younger brother and assistant of the more famous royal architect Louis Le Vau, who designed facades and rooms for the Palace of Versailles, Louvre and Institut de France. The church was the only building François built without his brother. It is in the French Baroque style of the 17th century.

The first stone was placed on 1 October 1664 by the Archbishop of Paris, but work was delayed by a shortage of funds and other mishaps. The architect died soon after the project began, and was replaced by Gabriel Le Duc and then by two more architects in succession. A wind storm in 1701 destroyed the new roof. Due to the long delays, houses were built next to the church, taking the space originally intended for the traditional west front, which had to be relocated. The church was not completed until 14 July 1726, sixty years after the beginning of its construction. The original bell tower was destroyed by a storm in 1740, and was replaced by a new openwork tower, which allowed the strong winds on the island to pass through. Another unusual feature of the tower is the clock, which hangs over the street like a shop sign.

During the French Revolution, the church was closed, stripped of decoration, put up for sale, and turned into a storehouse for books. The buyer of the building returned it to the church in 1805, and the first mass was celebrated there on 10 March 1805 by Pope Pius VII, who had come to Paris the previous December to crown Napoleon Emperor.

The City of Paris purchased the building in 1817 and later a long campaign was begun to add new murals, paintings, sculpture and windows. This was led by the Abbot Louis-Auguste-Napoléon Bossuet, the curé of the Parish from 1864 to 1888. He sold his personal library in 1888 and used the funds to add a profusion of gilding, murals, sculptures in stucco, and the windows that are seen today.

== Exterior ==
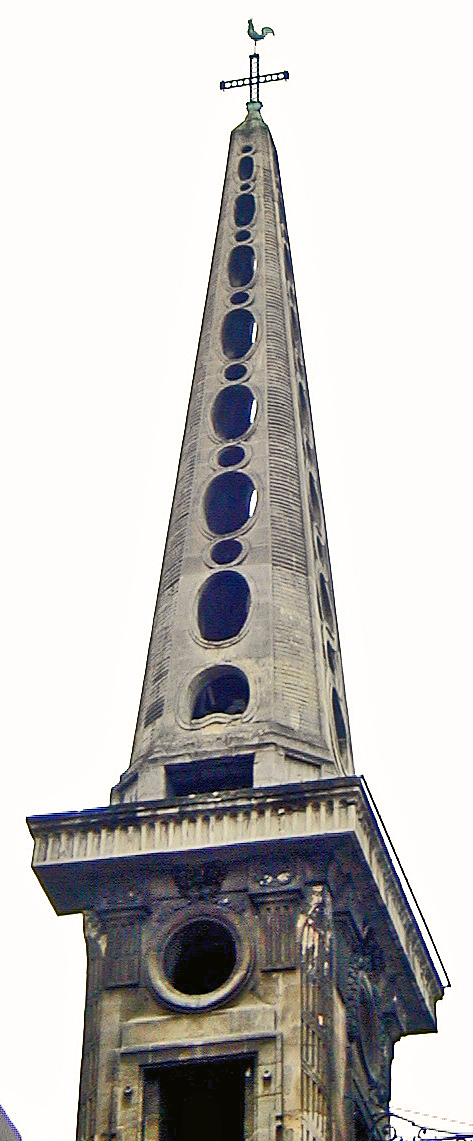
The spire is unusual, designed to allow the wind to pass through

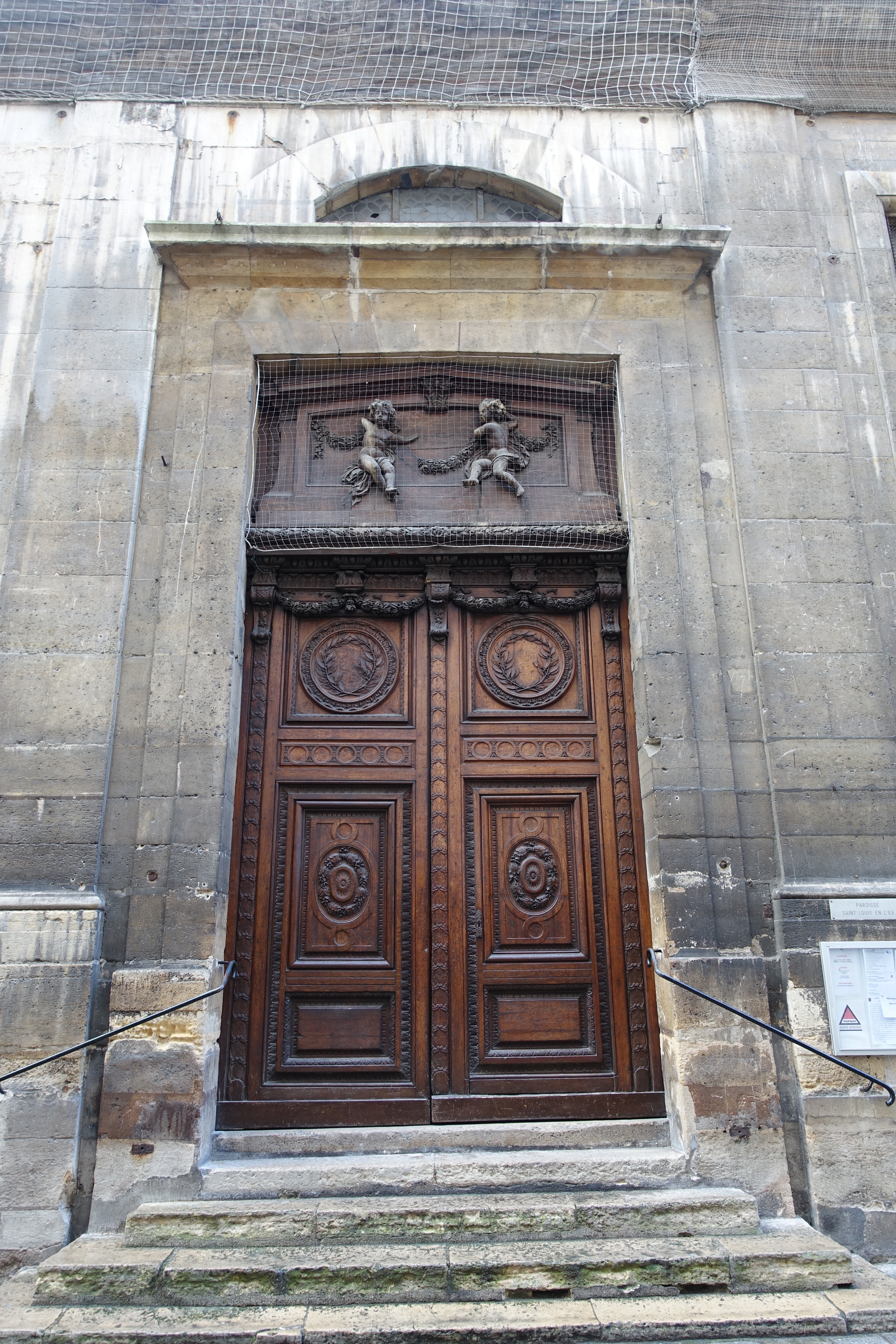
Sculpture depicting two angels holding the royal coat of arms. The coat of arms was smashed during the French Revolution.

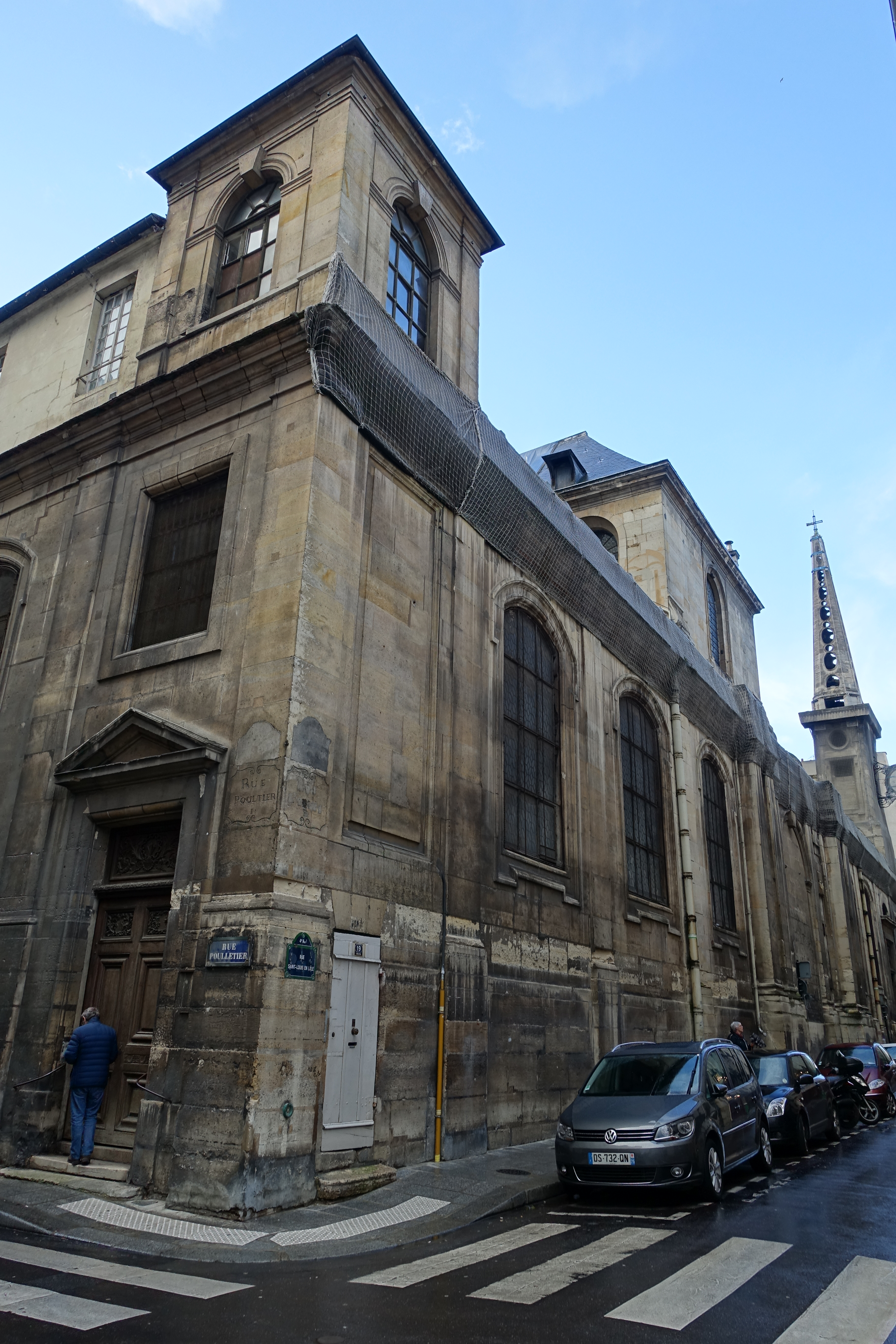
Facade of the church on Rue Saint-Louis-en-l'Île

A clock suspended from the side of the tower indicates the entrance of the church. The portal is decorated with a sculpture depicting two angels with their arms outstretched holding the coat of arms of France. This was a reference to the patron saint of the church, King Louis VII or Saint Louis. The angels are still there, but the coat of arms was smashed during the French Revolution.

== Interior ==
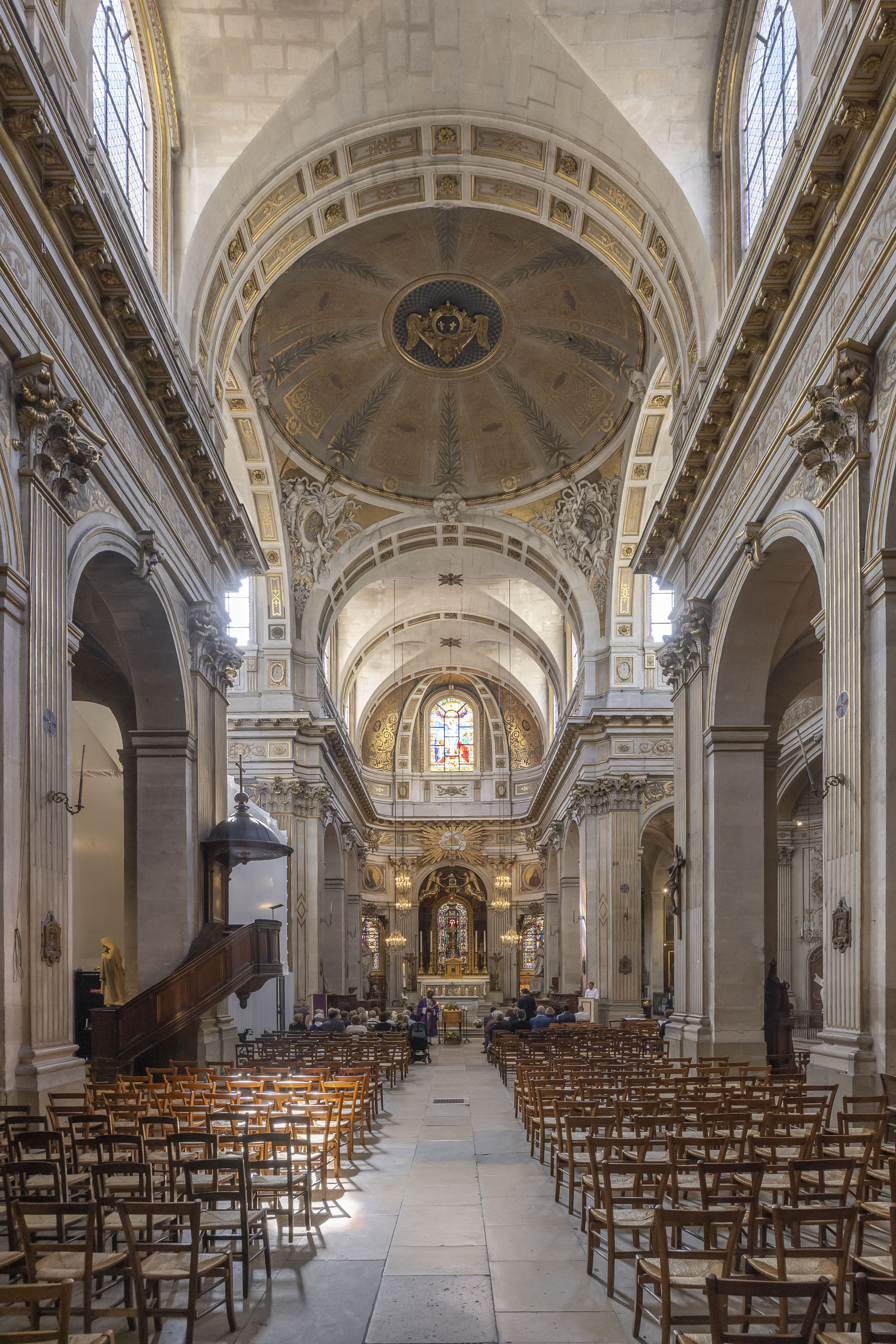
The nave and choir

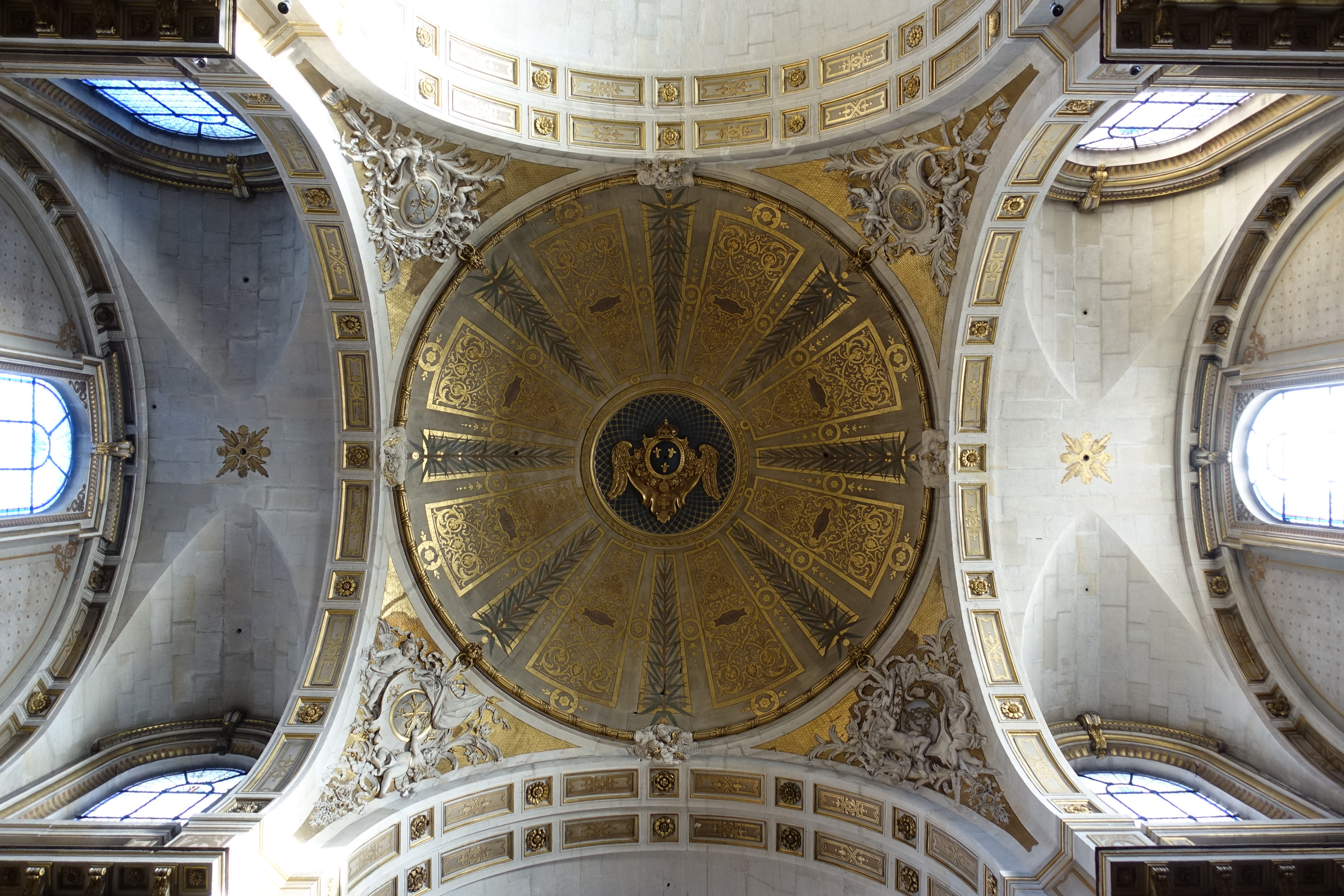
The ceiling, with royal emblems

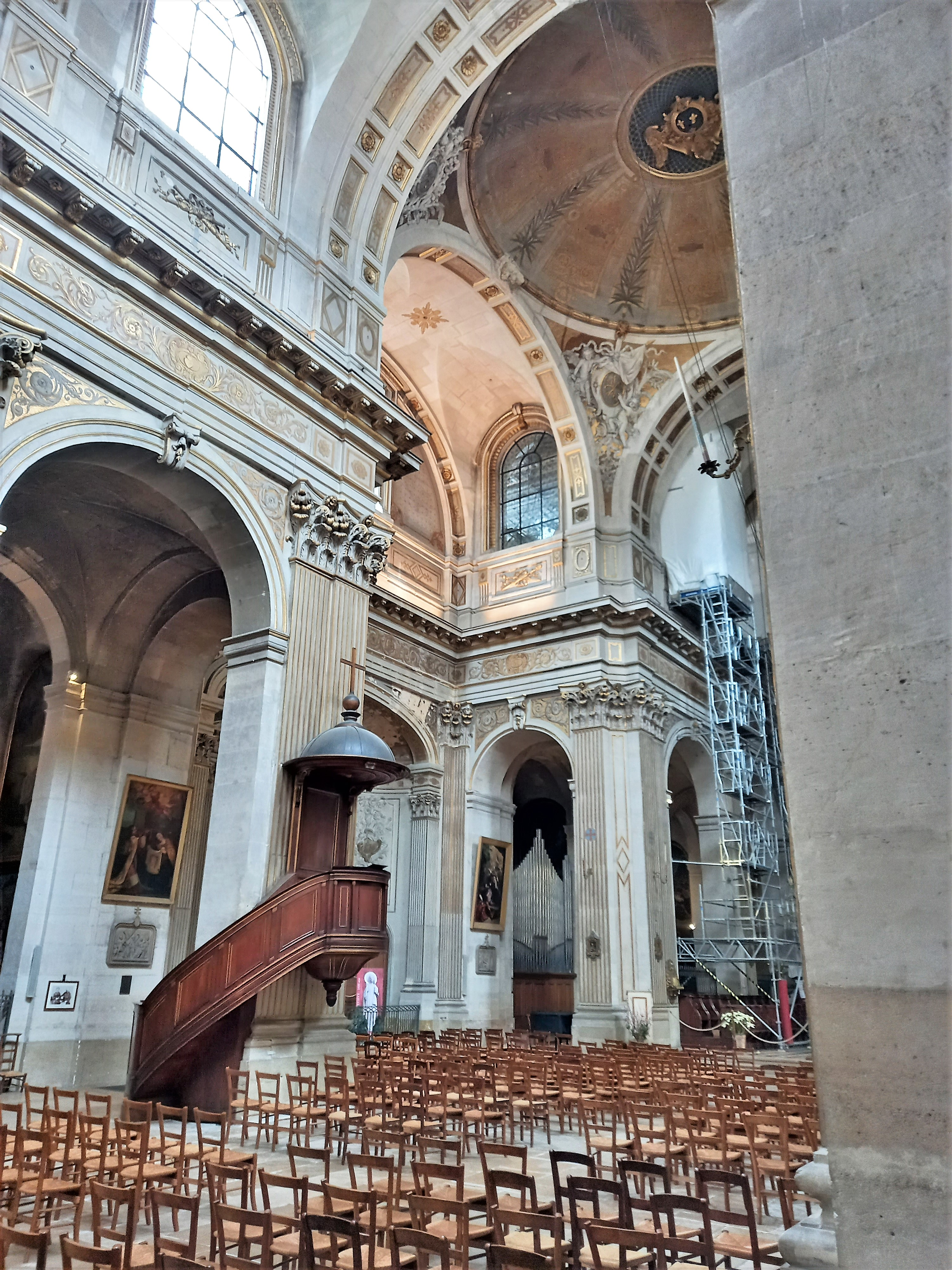
The transept and pulpit

The interior is very large, but is given a more human dimension by the profusion of ornament and gilding, and detail. was decorated following drawings by Jean-Baptiste de Champaigne (1631–1681), and displays the lavish French Baroque style of the 17th century. The arcades have rounded arches and as pilasters with trompe-l'oeil channelling, joined with columns with Corinthian capitals, carved of travertine stone, and decorated with sculpted foliage and angels. Other decoration includes a variety of sculpted sceptres, the hands of justice and other royal emblems, illustrating the association with King Louis IX.

=== The Chapels ===
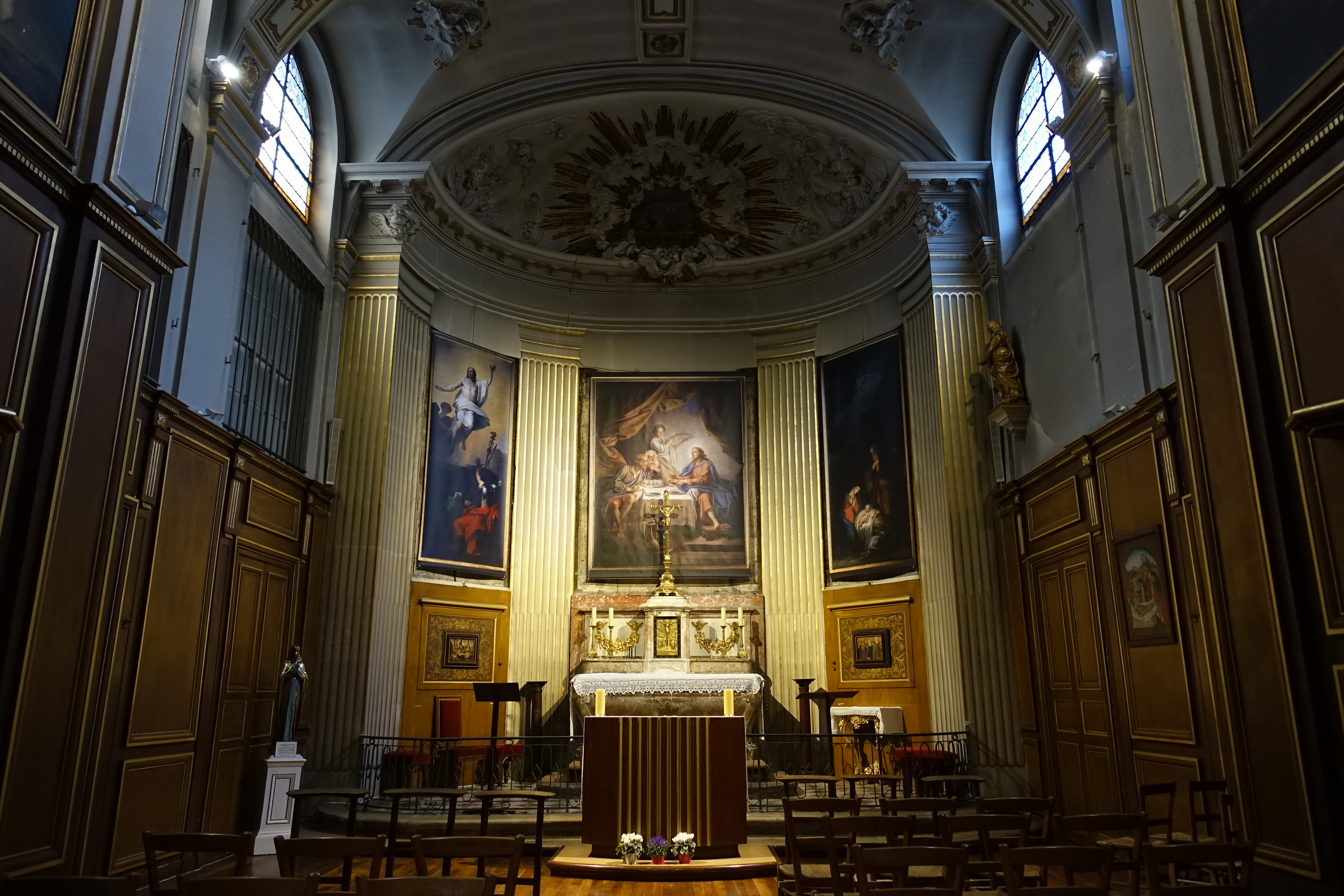
Chapel of the Compassion

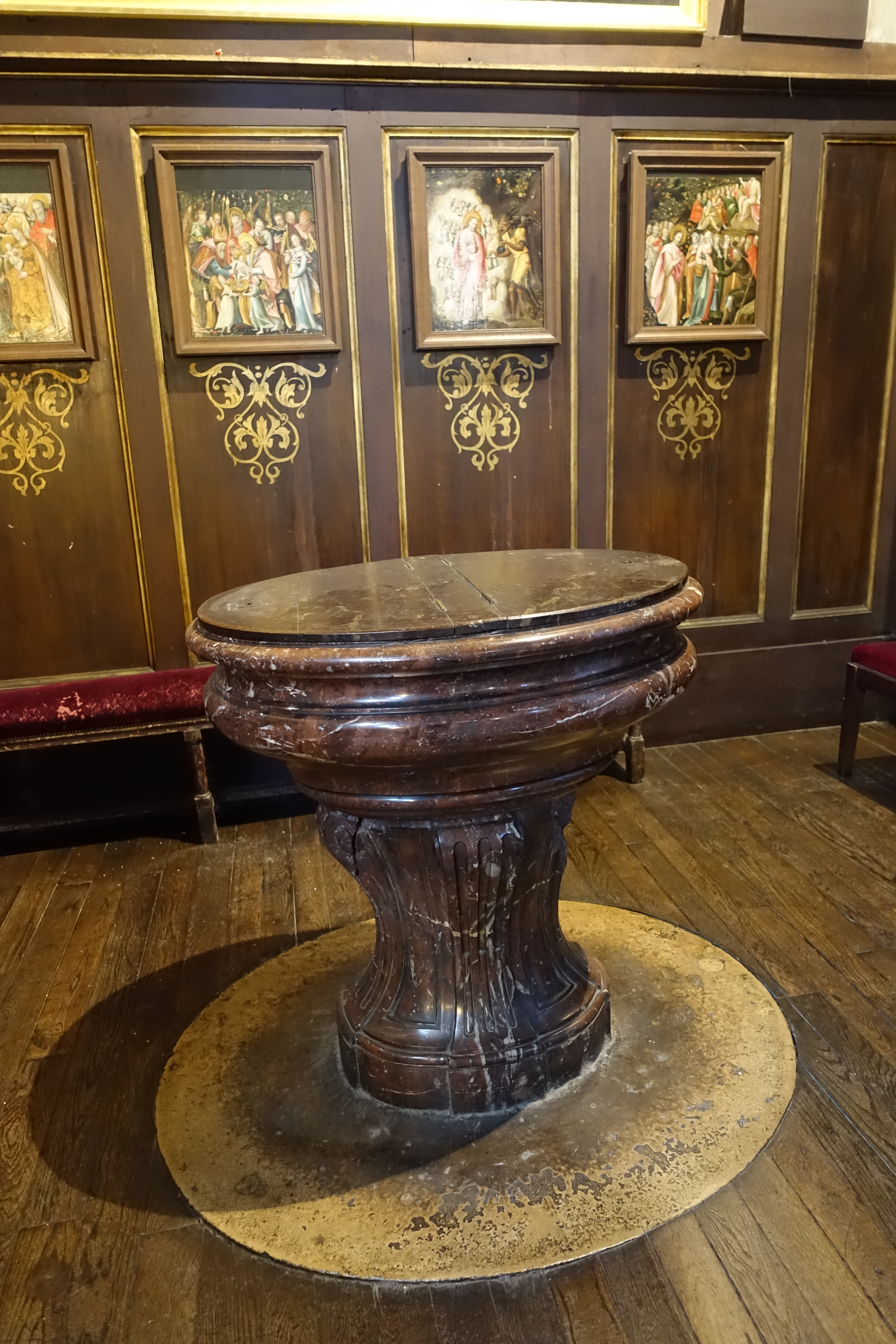
Chapel of Baptisms

A series of chapels line the outer aisles of the nave, and are richly decorated with paintings and sculpture.-

The Chapel of the Communion displays "The Pilgrims of Emmaeus", by Charles Coypel (1694–1752), vividly illustrating a celebration of the Eucharist, crowded with figures and full of movement.

-The Chapel of the Compassion displays three paintings by the 19th-century French artist Karl-Henri Lehmann (1814–1882); "The Annunciation", "The Virgin Presenting Christ to the World" and "The Virgin and the Saints at the Foot of the Cross". Lehmann was a prominent figure in the school of French Romanticism"; the "Virgin and the Saints" painting was presented at the 1848 Paris Salon.

-The Chapel of Baptism displays a group of eight small paintings representing scenes from the life of Christ, set into the wood panelling. These are attributed to artists at the beginning of the 17th century. Along with them is a work of the French Renaissance painter Jacques Stella (1596–1657), "The Baptism of Christ", inspired by the art of the Italian Renaissance.

– The Chapel of Saint Mary Magdalene contains a monument to the 19th century abbot Bossuet, an important benefactor of the church.

== Art and Decoration ==
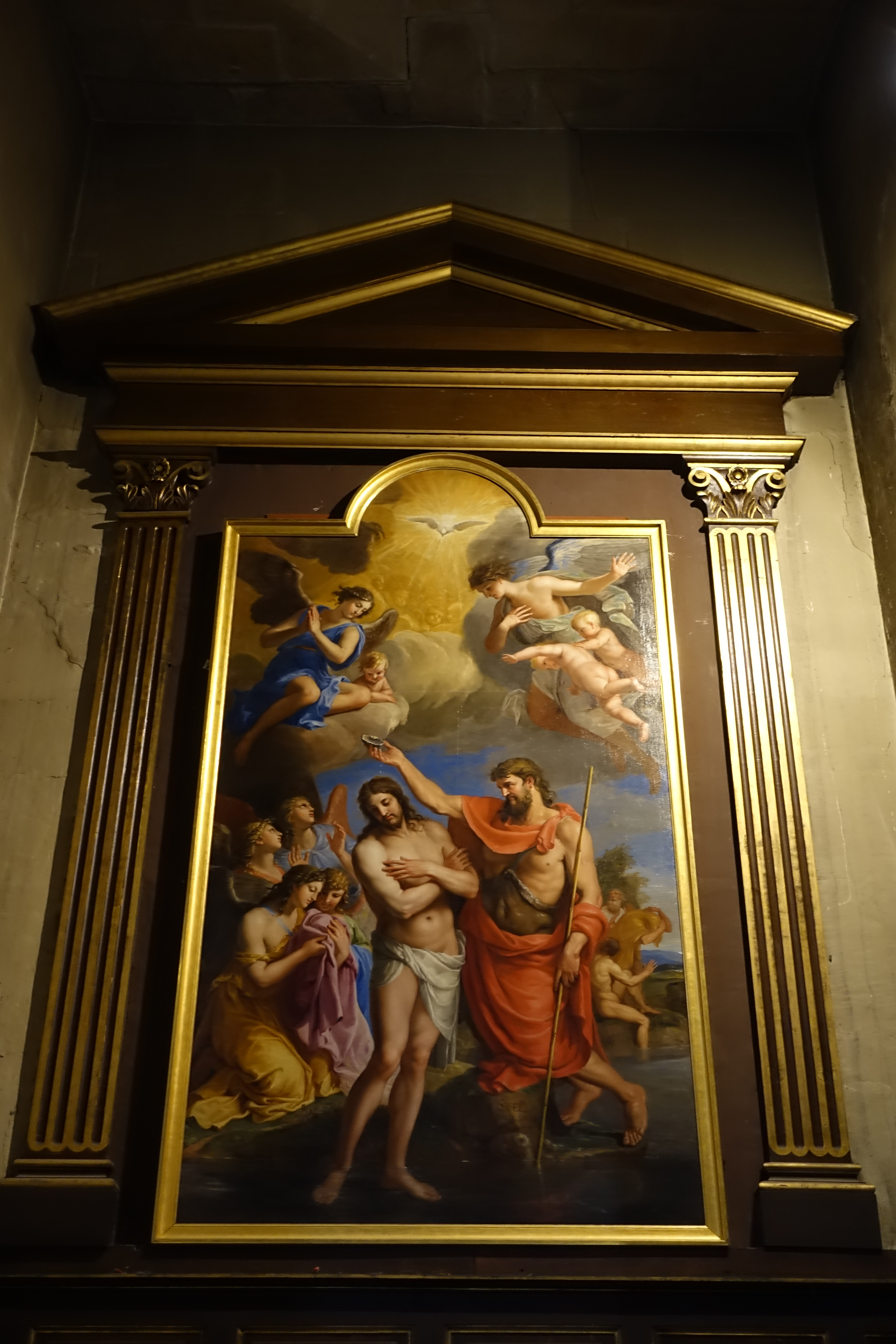
"Baptism of Christ" by Jacques Stella (1596-1657)

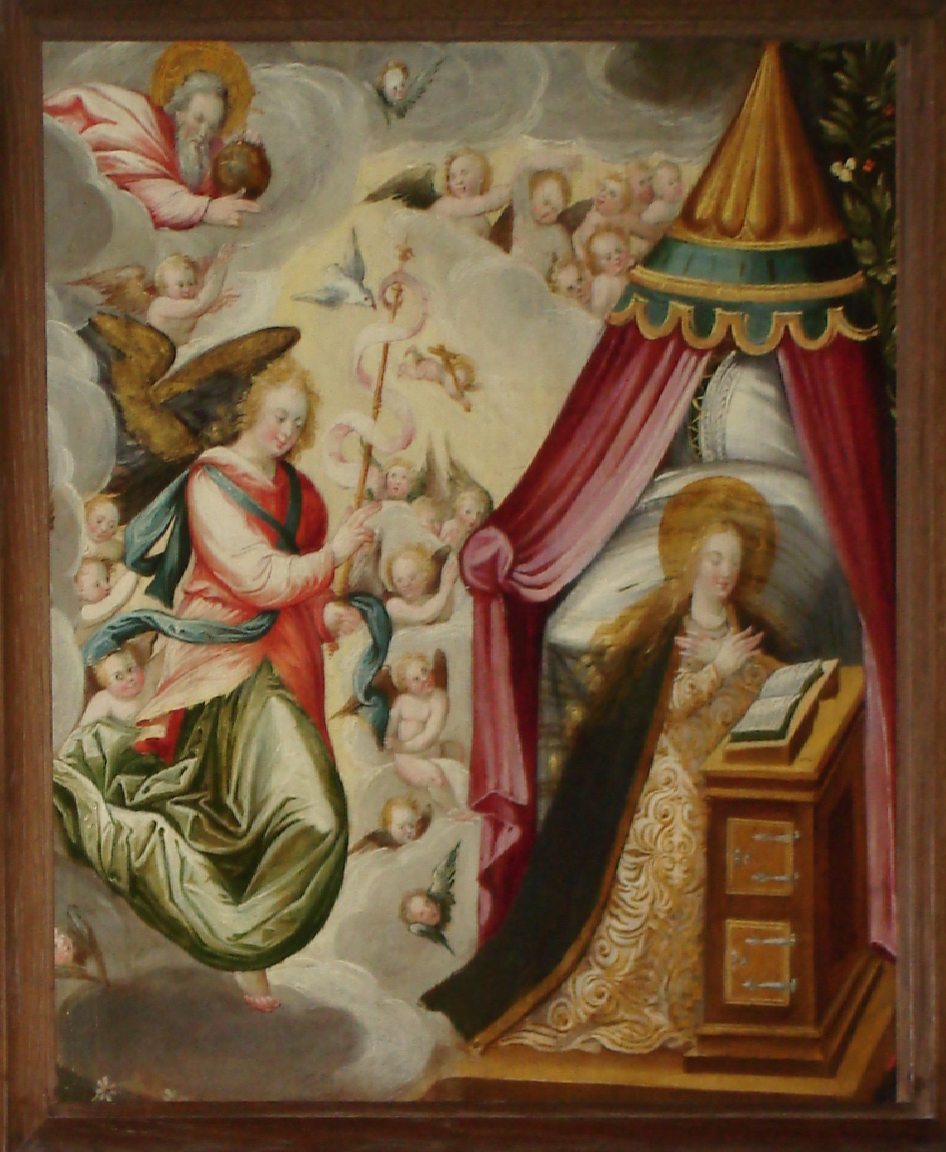
"The Annunciation" by Circle of Gabriel Dreer (c. 1600)

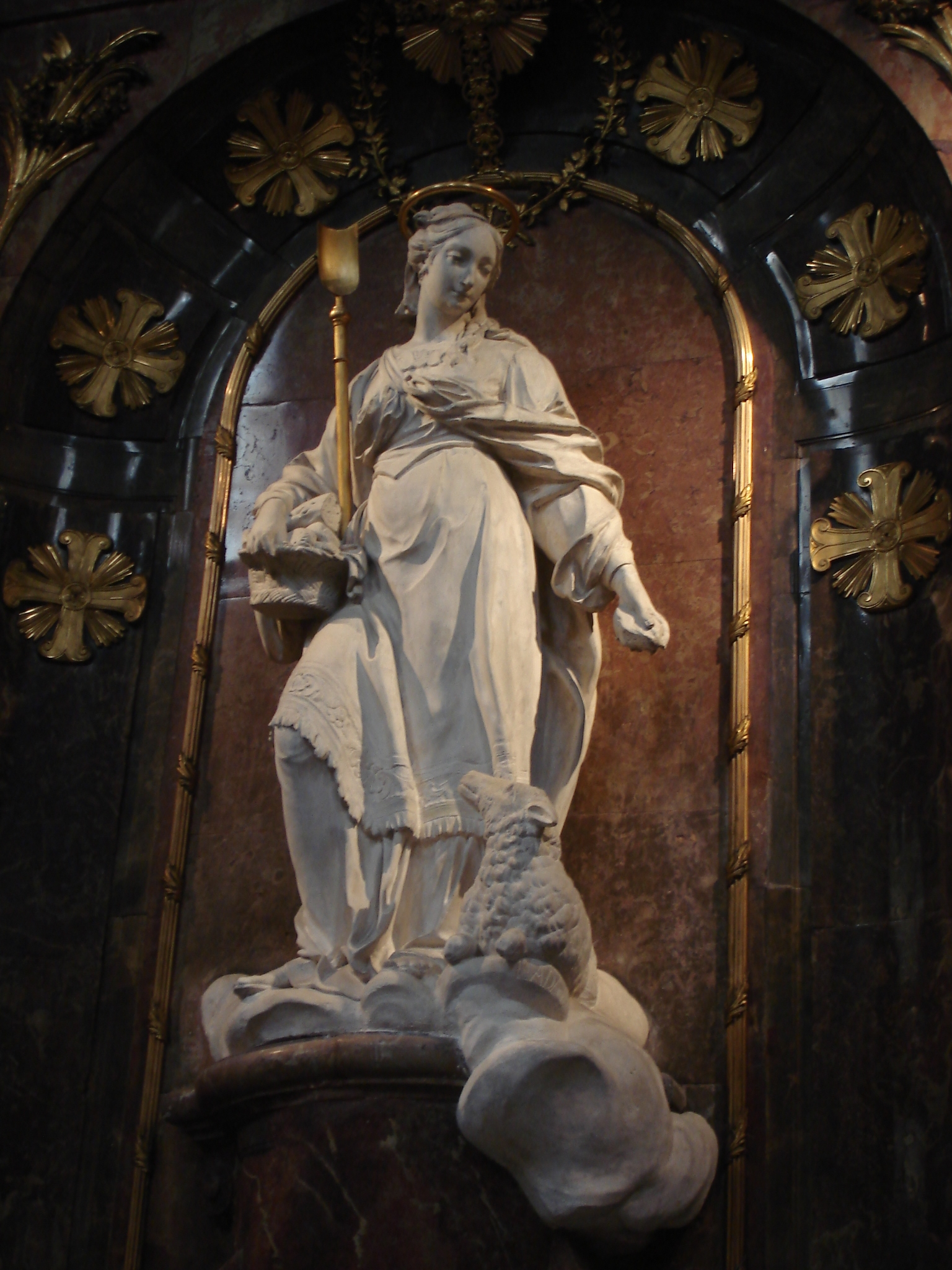
"Saint Genevieve" by François Ladatte (1706-1787)

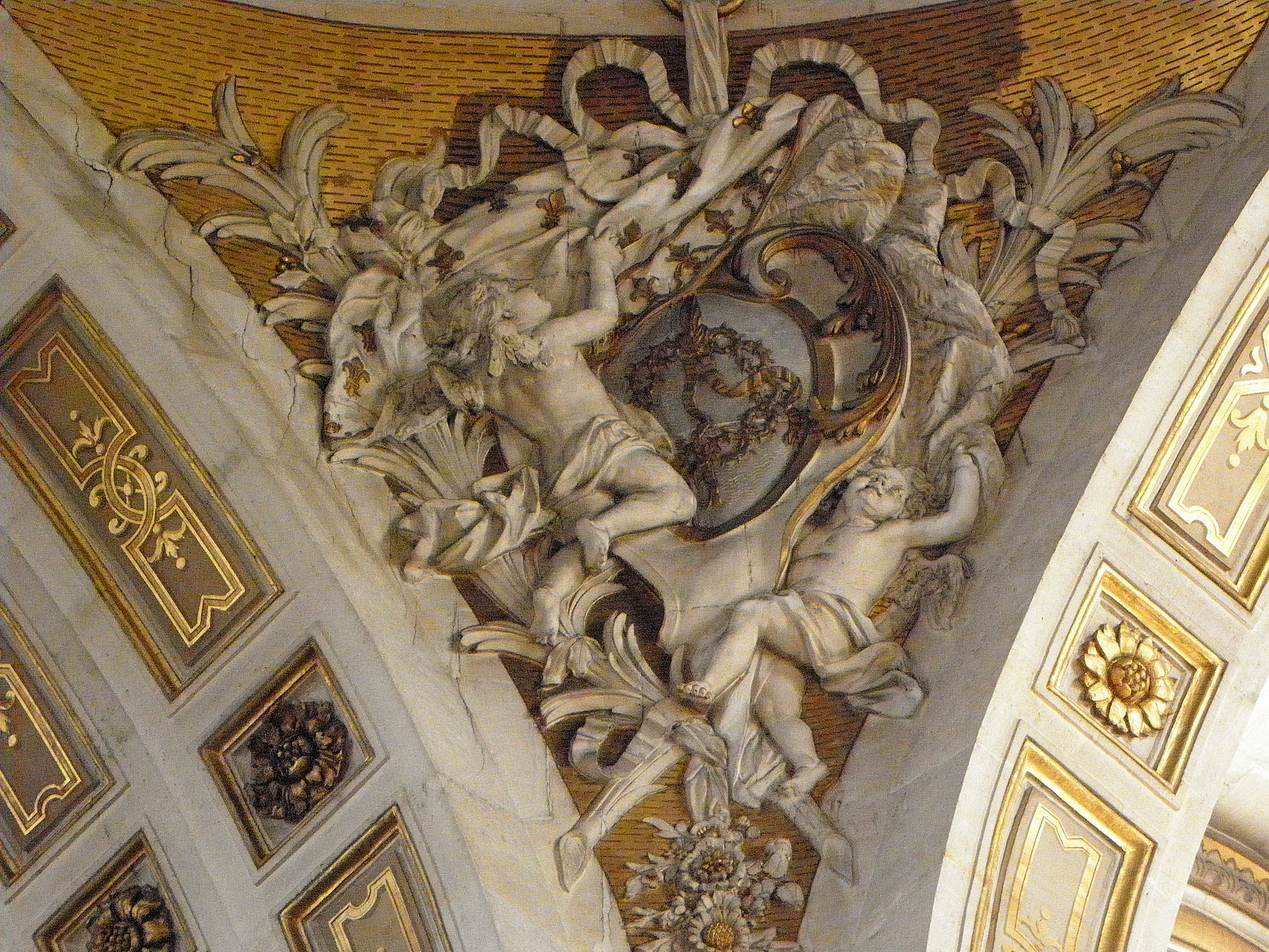
Detail of the sculpture in the pendentive of the dome in the choir.

The church, particularly in the choir, the transept and the chapels along the outer aisles, is particularly rich in art and decoration of the French Baroque period in the 18th century, as well as more modern work from the 19th century. The art includes painting, sculpture, and smaller intricate works in alabaster and other rare materials.

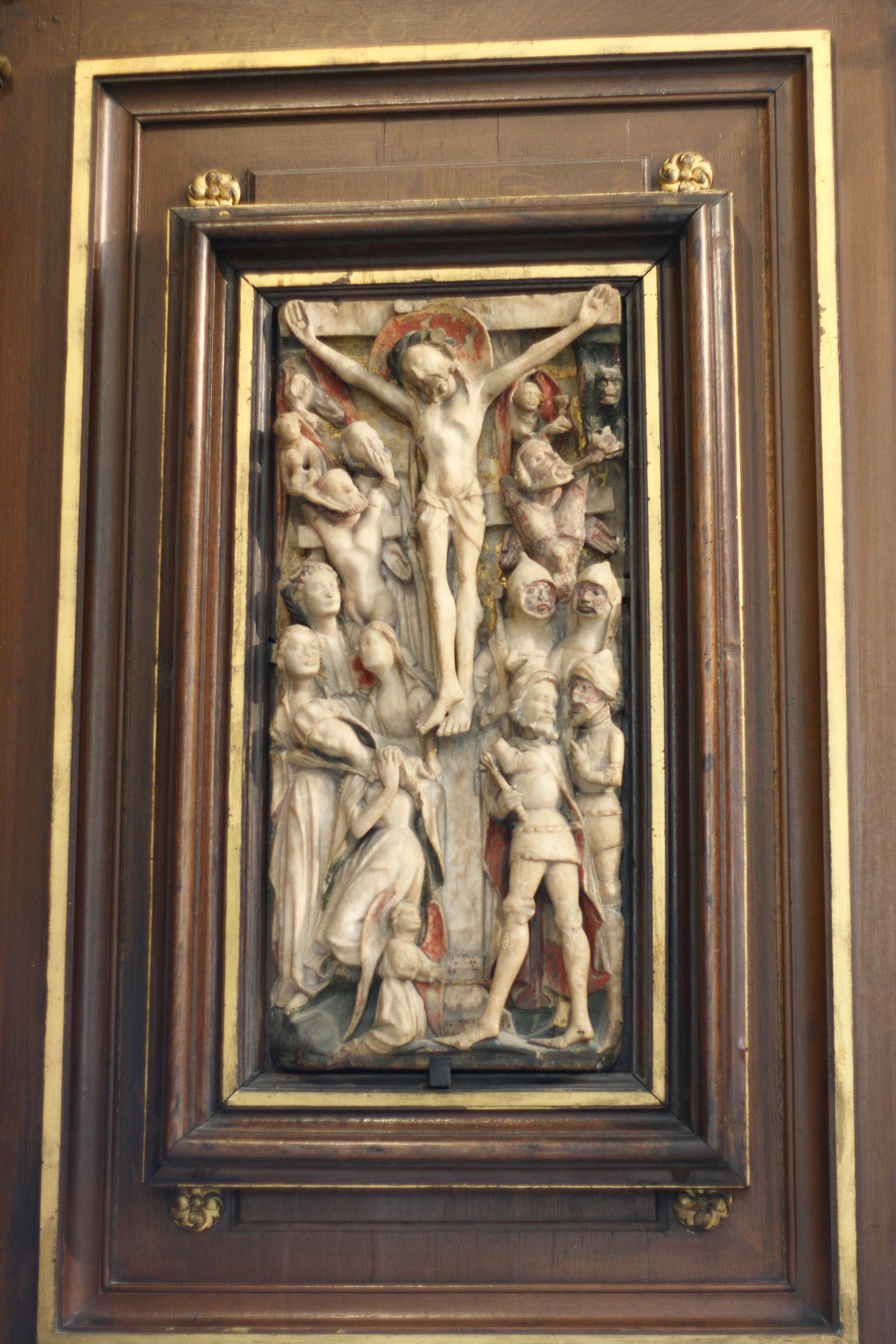
Alabaster relief of Christ on the Cross

== Stained Glass ==
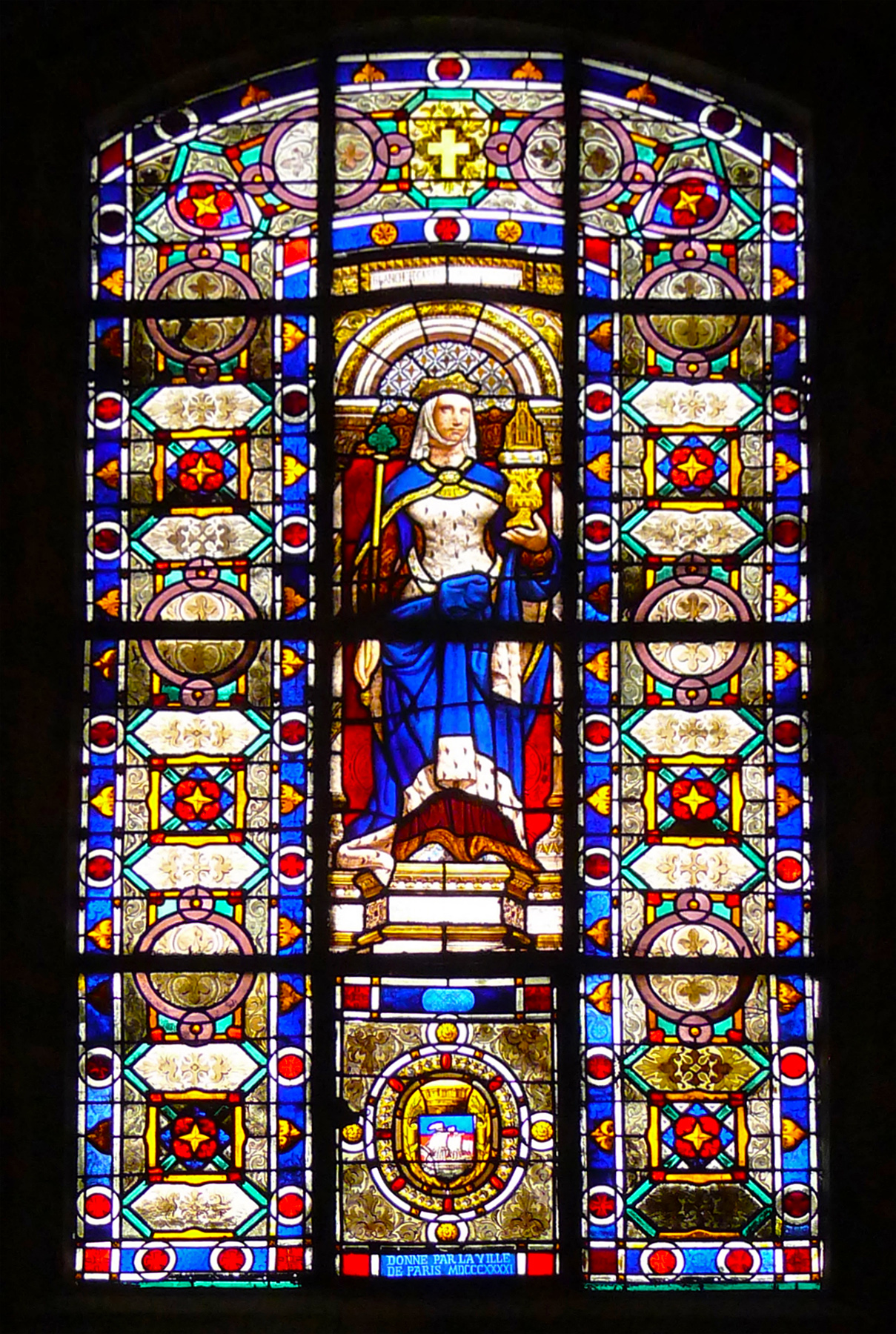
Window devoted to Blanche de Castille, mother of Saint Louis

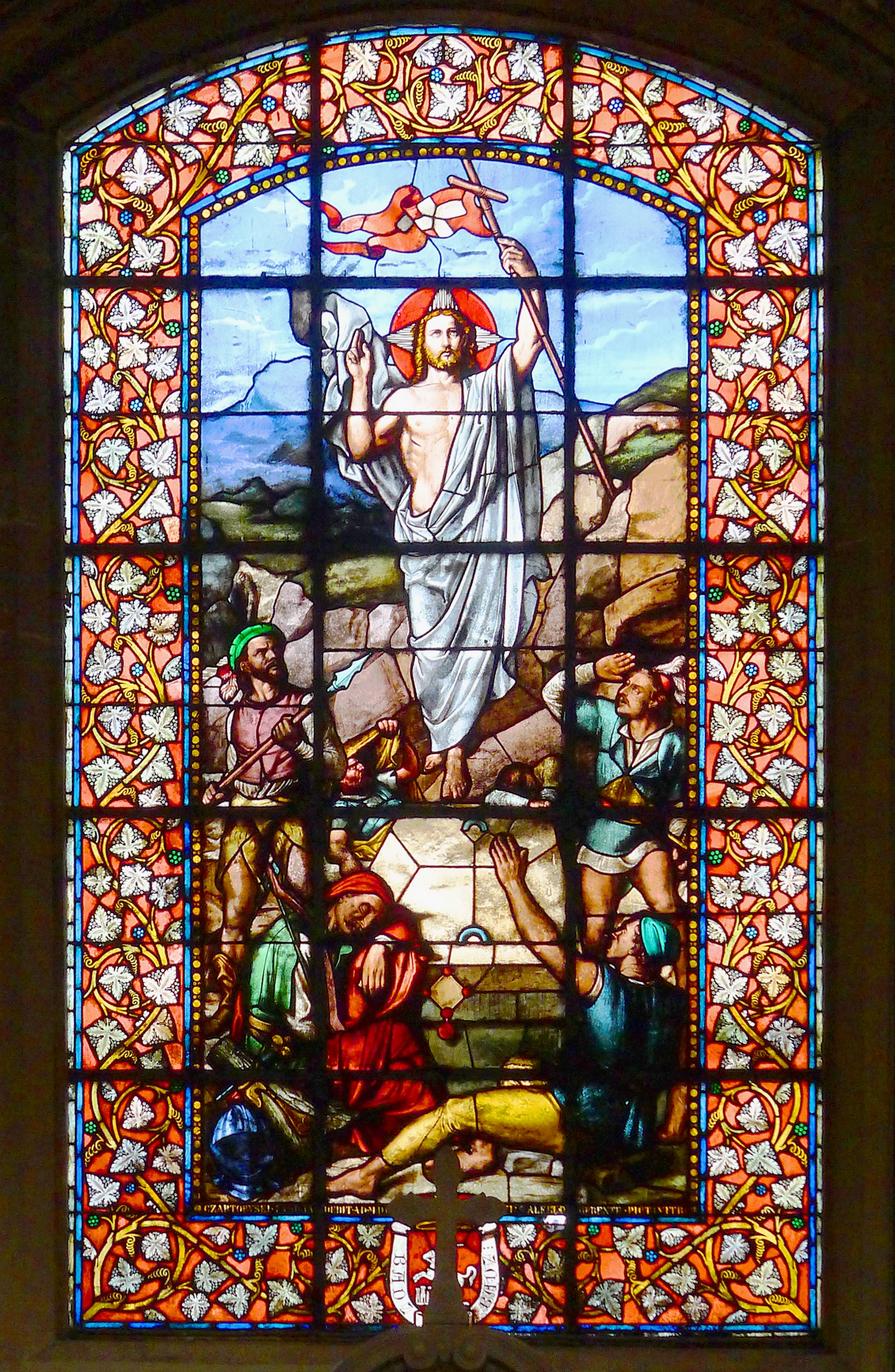
The Resurrection of Christ by Alfred Gérente (1866)

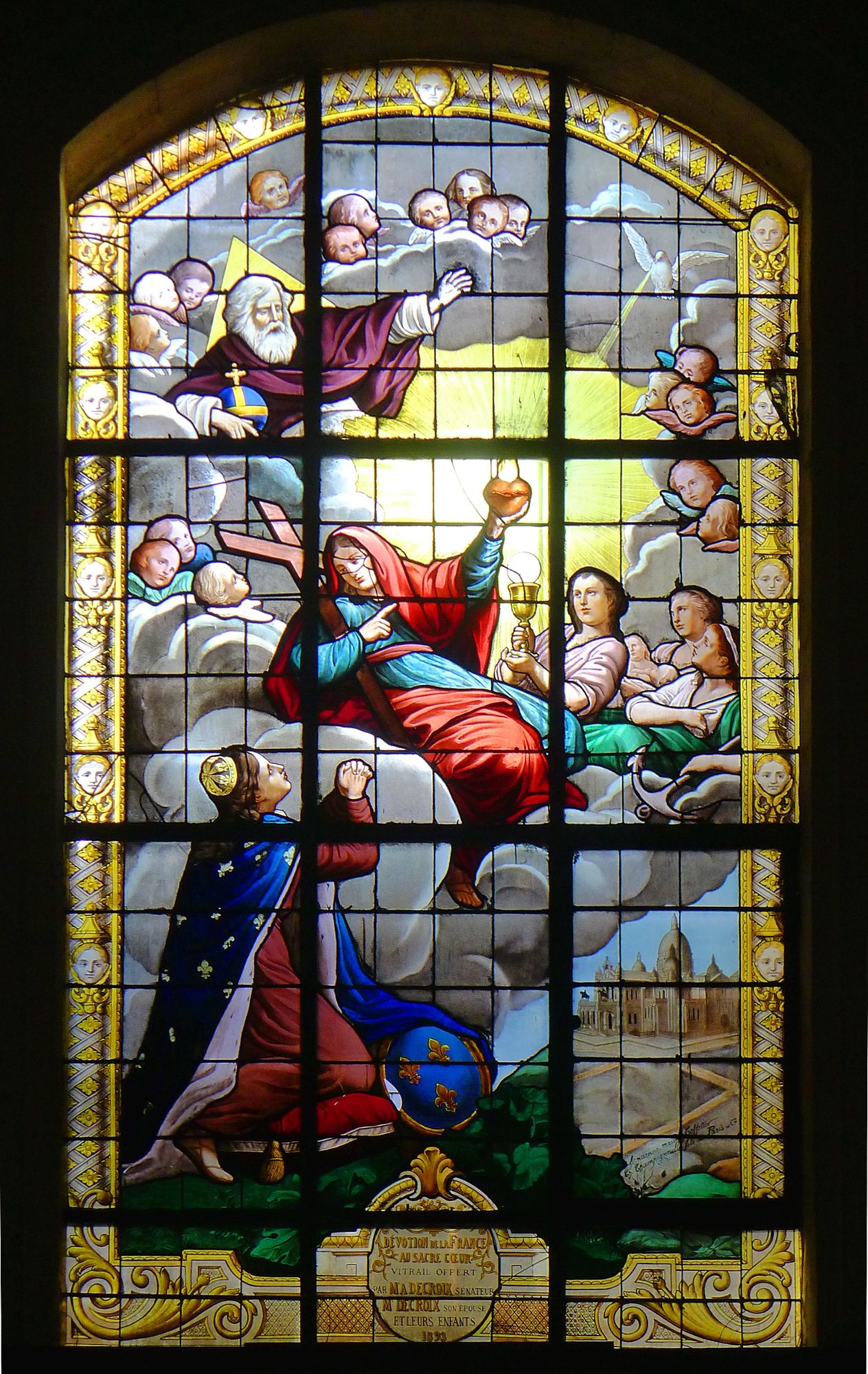
Devotion of France to the Sacred Heart

The stained glass windows mostly date to the mid-19th century; the major series, illustrating the life of Christ, are by Alfred Gérente.

== The Organ ==
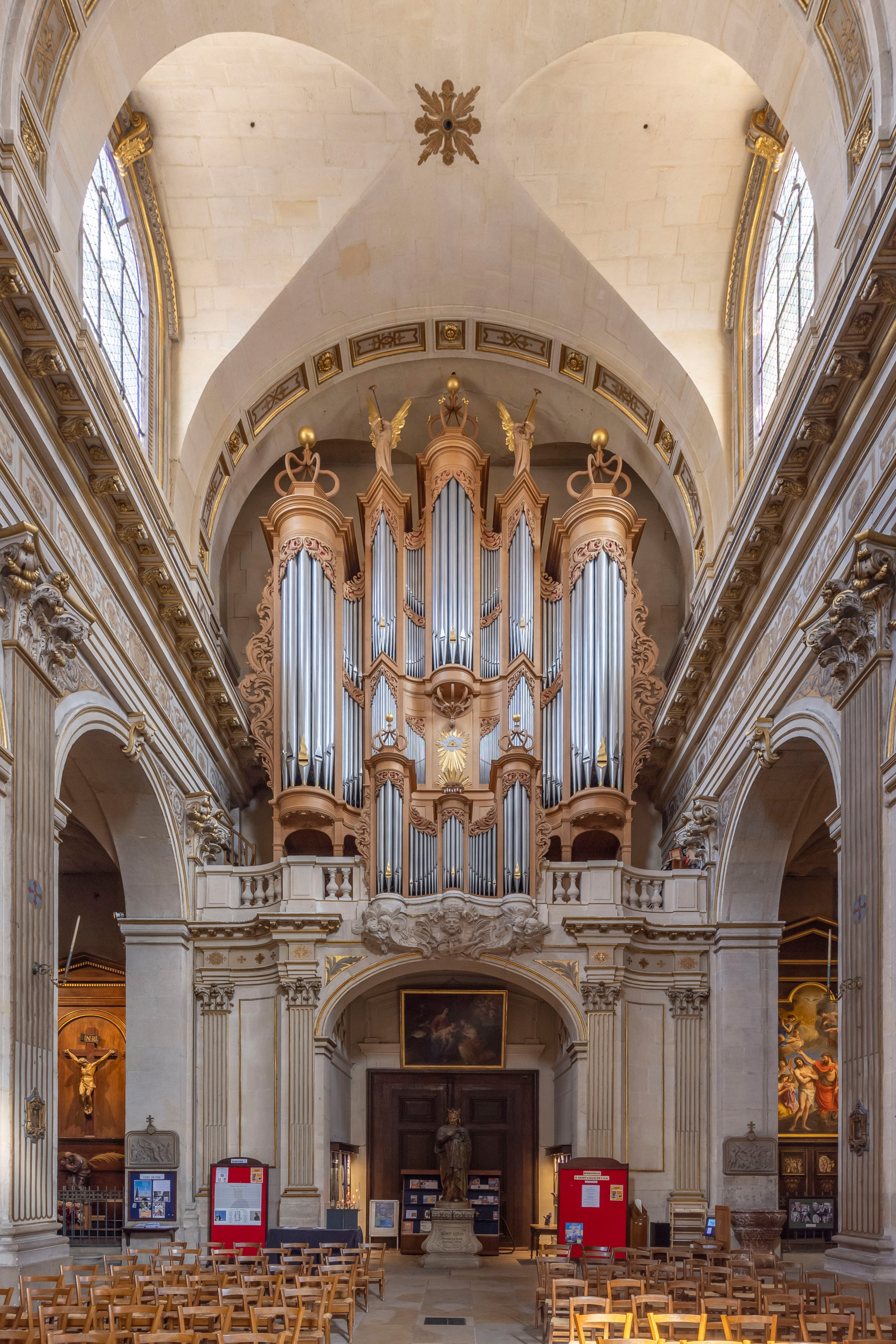
The great organ

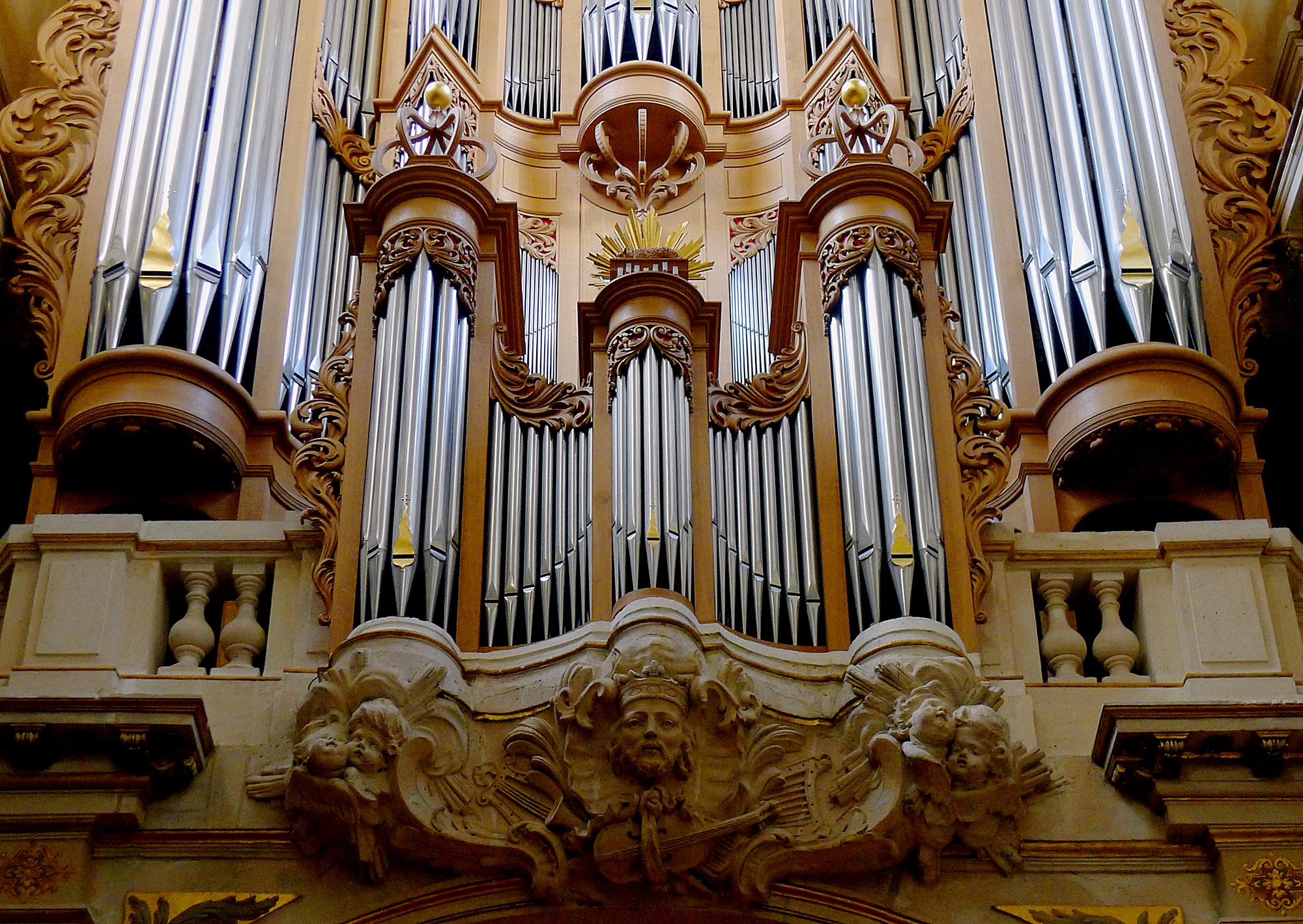
Detail of the great organ

No trace remains of the original 17th-century organ. In 1744 it was replaced by a new organ by Lesclop, with a very ornate buffet or case covered with rocaille sculpture. This instrument, like most of the other Paris organs of the period, was destroyed during the French Revolution, to recover the lead used in the pipes to make munitions.

In the 19th century, a smaller instrument by Merklin was installed on the tribune, but it was of mediocre quality. This organ was replaced in 1923 by a new organ made by Charles Mutin, which kept the buffet of the earlier instrument. This organ also was of poor quality and was poorly maintained. A smaller organ was installed in the choir in the 1960s, which served as the church organ for several decades.

In 2005, the present organ was completed by Bernard Aubertin, with funding from the City of Paris. The present organ is in the German style, or Bach type. It has fifty-one stops, While the instrument is new, it preserves the original tower sculpture and sculpted angels of the 18th century buffet.

== See also ==
- List of historic churches in Paris

== Bibliography (in French) ==
- Dumoulin, Aline; Ardisson, Alexandra; Maingard, Jérôme; Antonello, Murielle; Églises de Paris (2010), Éditions Massin, Issy-Les-Moulineaux, ISBN 978-2-7072-0683-1
- Fierro, Alfred (1996). Histoire et dictionnaire de Paris. Robert Laffont. ISBN 2-221--07862-4.
- Lecompte, Francis (2013). Notre-Dame, Île de la Cité et Île Saint-Louis (in English and French). Massin. ISBN 978-2-7072-0835-4.
- Poisson, Michel (2009). 1000 Immeubles et Monuments de Paris. Parigramme. ISBN 978-2-84096-539-8.

== External links (in French) ==
- Website (in French)
- Saint-Louis en l’Île (in French)
- Site de la paroisse.
- Site du patrimoine.
