= Château de Bercy =

Former château in Paris, France

Coordinates: 48.82873°N 2.4006°E

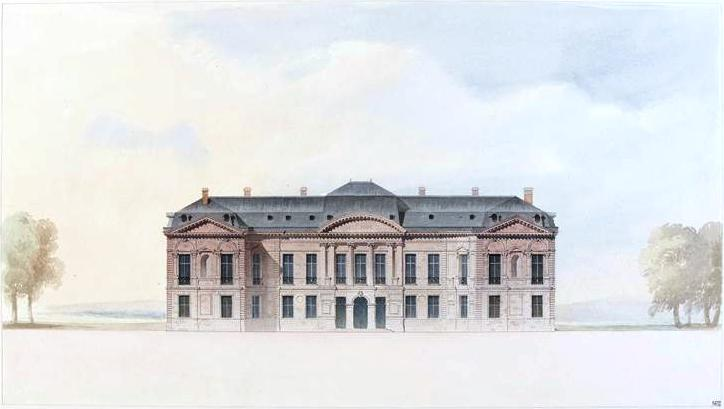
Drawing of the Château de Bercy entrance façade in 1860

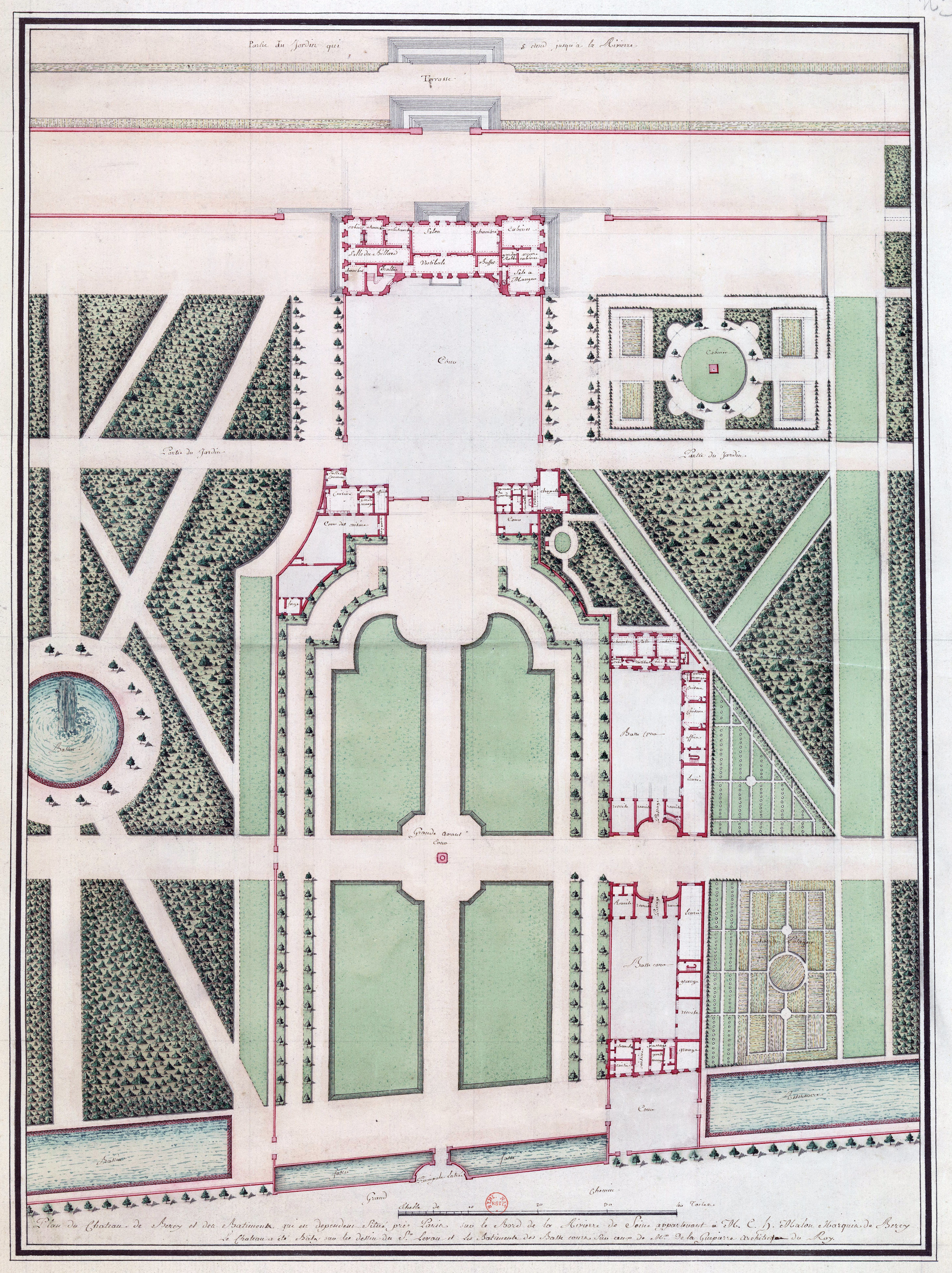
Plan of the château, entrance court, forecourt and stables; the garden facade (at the top) faces southwest

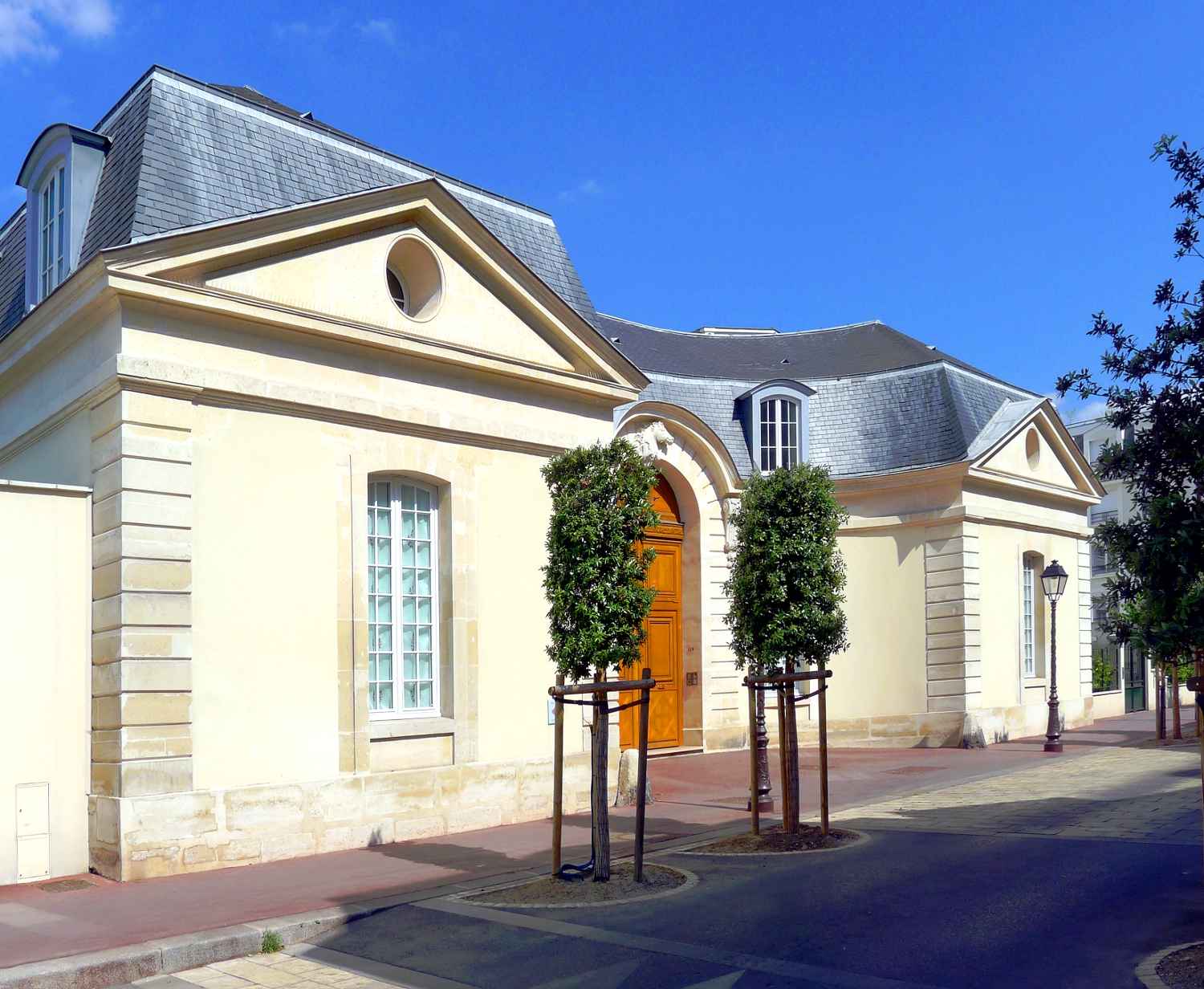
The surviving north hunting pavilion

The Château de Bercy was a French château located in Bercy, a part of modern-day Charenton-le-Pont in Paris.

== History ==
The château was constructed beginning in 1658 for Charles-Henri I de Malon de Bercy by architect François Le Vau, Louis Le Vau's younger brother. It was unfinished upon the death of the younger Le Vau in 1676. Malon de Bercy's son and heir, Charles-Henri II de Malon de Bercy (1678–1742), superintendent of finances, finished its construction, but modified the plans, filling in the moats, creating gardens, and altering the interior distribution. The château was reworked from 1702 to 1713 by the architect Jacques de La Guépière, who added to the service buildings. Charles-Henri II commissioned sculptors employed on royal buildings to modernize the château's furnishings in 1713–14.

The gardens, designed by André Le Nôtre, extended to the banks of the Seine river. They were also known as the Parc de Bercy. The whole Bercy area around the château and the river were full of gardens and other houses and mansions. These gradually gave way to more condensed housing as the city grew in population during the 19th century.

The château was sold and demolished in 1861. Today the main SNCF route from east to west, the Périphérique and the autoroute de l'Est run where the garden of Le Nôtre used to be. Only two hunting pavilions survive, built 1713–1714 to the designs of Jacques de La Guépière and located on either side of the rue du Petit Château.

One of the console tables became a part of the collections of the Louvre Museum.

== Bibliography ==
- Deshairs, Léon (1911). Le Château de Bercy. Architecture et décoration, fin du règne de Louis XIV. Paris: Calavas. OCLC 8123686.
- Gallet, Michel (1995). Les Architectes Parisiens du XVIIIe siècle : Dictionnaire biographique et critique, "Jacques de La Guépière", p. 277. Paris: Mengès. ISBN 9782856203705.
- Hautecoeur, Louis (1948). Histoire de l'Architecture classique en France. Tome 2: Le Règne de Louis XIV. Paris: J. Picard. OCLC 489711032, 476619163.
- Le Goff, Guy (1991). C.A.O.A du dépt. du Maine-et-Loire, "Une visite à Brissac" (L'Estampille-L'Objet d'Art" no. 248/juin 1991, p. 52, ill. - archives pers.).
- Pons, Bruno (1995). Grands décors français (1650–1800) reconstitués en Angleterre, aux États-Unis, en Amérique du Sud et en France (Dijon, éditions Faton, 1995, p. 48-53, 185–208);
