= Château de Sucy-en-Brie =

Château in Sucy-en-Brie, France

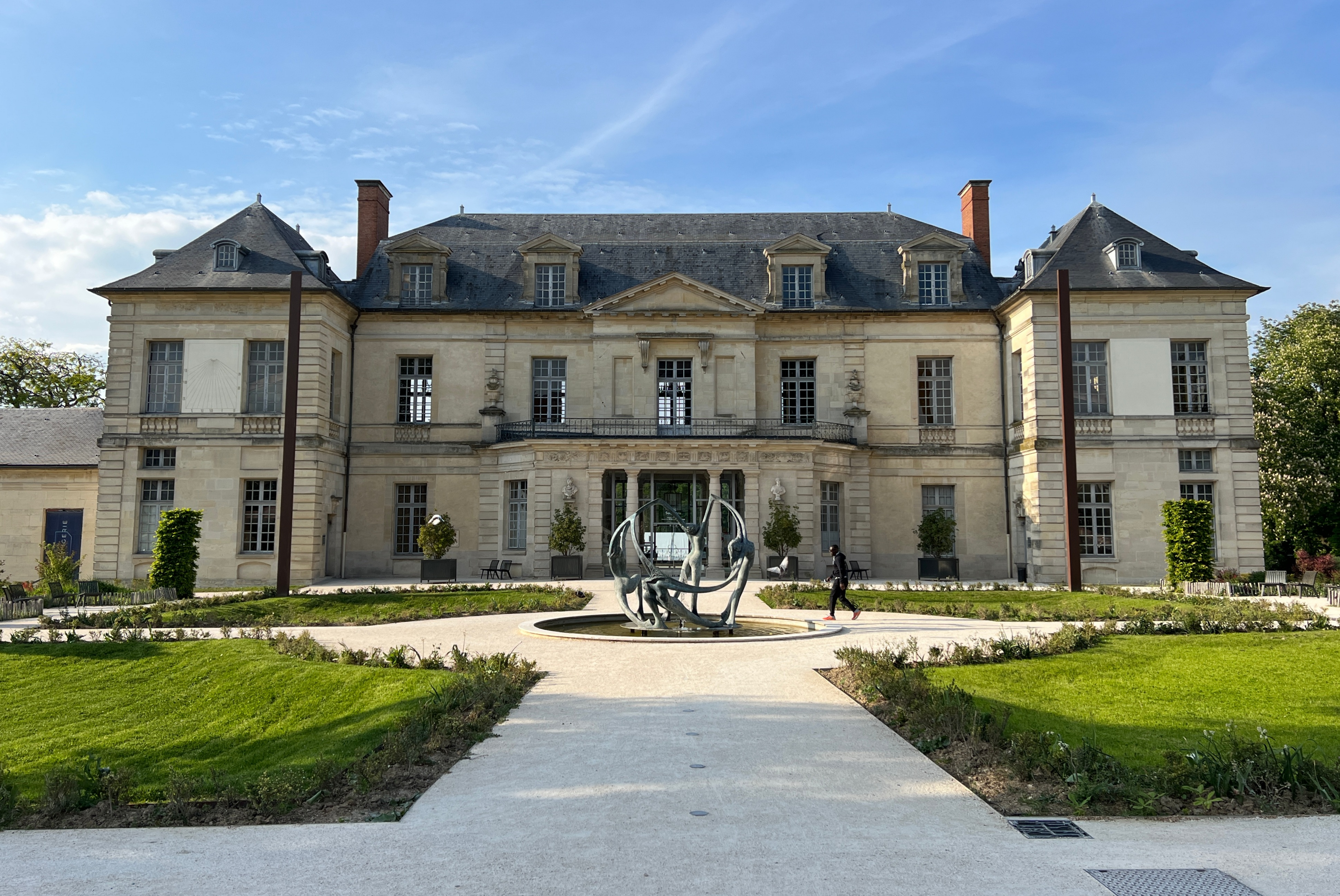
- View of the entrance front

- Location within France

General information
- Architectural style: Classical
- Location: Sucy-en-Brie, France
- Coordinates: 48.77159°N 2.52183°E
- Construction started: 1660

Design and construction
- Architect: François Le Vau

The Château de Sucy-en-Brie is a French château located at 1 Avenue Georges Pompidou in the commune of Sucy-en-Brie (current département of Val-de-Marne). It is also known as the Château Lambert (after its first owner, Nicolas Lambert, Sieur de Thorigny) and Château de Berc (after its last owner). The château was constructed beginning in 1660, to designs of the French architect François Le Vau. Today it is owned by the commune of Sucy-en-Brie and is used as a conservatory of music.

The building is typical of classical French château design, consisting of a corps de logis flanked by two pavilions. Built in cut stone, it has a ground floor and a main floor, topped with an attic storey under a mansard roof covered with slate.

It has been classified as a monument historique since 18 July 1975.

== Bibliography ==
- Babelon, Jean-Pierre (1974). "Le château de Sucy en Brie, oeuvre de François Le Vau", in Bulletin de la Société de l'histoire de Paris et de l'Ile de France, 1974-1975, pp 83-102, Copy at Gallica.
- Feldmann, Dietrich (1996). "Le Vau", vol. 19, pp. 262–268, in The Dictionary of Art, 34 volumes, edited by Jane Turner. New York: Grove. ISBN 9781884446009. Also available at Oxford Art Online (subscription required).
