= Louis Hautecœur =

French art historian and museum conservator (1884–1973)

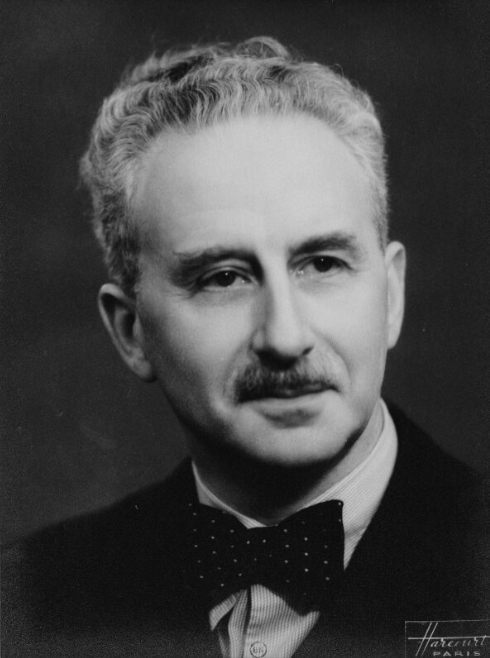
- Portrait of Louis Hautecœur
- Born: Louis-Eugène-Georges Hautecœur; June 11, 1884; Paris, France
- Died: November 17, 1973 (aged 89); Paris, France
- Education: École Normale Supérieure, École française de Rome
- Occupations: Art historian, museum conservator, educator
- Notable work: Histoire de l'architecture classique en France
- Spouse(s): Marcelle Charlotte Poullain (m. 1909–1927), Marguerite Milliez (m. 1956–1973)
- Awards: Knight of the Legion of Honour (1938)

Louis-Eugène-Georges Hautecœur (11 June 1884, Paris – 17 November 1973, Paris) was a French art historian and museum conservator.

== Biography ==
He was born to Alfred Albert Hautecœur and his wife, Jeanne née Barrault, who were print merchants. After attending the Lycée Henri-IV, he was admitted to the École Normale Supérieure in 1905, and passed his exam for becoming an agrégé in 1908. He was with the École française de Rome from then until 1910, during which time he was in charge of excavations in Tunisia, under the aegis of the Académie des Inscriptions et Belles Lettres. In 1909, he married his first wife, Marcelle Charlotte Poullain.

From 1910 until the start of World War I, he held several teaching positions, in Paris, Laon and Amiens. He was awarded a Doctorate in 1912, and was mobilized in 1914, serving as a Second-Lieutenant in the 152nd Infantry Division. In 1917, he was attached to the Ministry of War and became head of the Diplomatic Information Service in Lugano.

After the war, he was a professor of art history at the Université de Caen (1919-1931) and the École du Louvre (1920-1940). He also held the Chair of Architectural History at the École des Beaux-Arts (1920-1940). At the same time, he served in administrative positions; notably at the Louvre (1919-1927), and as the last conservator of the original Musée du Luxembourg (1927-1937). He also helped to organize its successor, the Musée National d’Art Moderne at the Palais de Tokyo; serving as its director until 1940. As a result of these activities, he was made a Knight in the Legion of Honor in 1938.

In July 1940, he was named Directeur Général des Beaux-Arts; replacing Georges Huisman, who was highly critical of the new Vichy government. From March 1941, he was Scrétaire Général des Beaux-Arts and Conseiller d'État. During his tenure, he was presented with the Ordre de la Francisque. Nevertheless, in early 1944, he was removed by order of Hermann Göring, for "refusal to collaborate", and he became director of studies at the École Pratique des Hautes Etudes.

Following the Liberation, he was reinstated as Secrétaire Général. He joined the Association for the Defence of the Memory of Marshal Pétain in 1951. The following year, he became a member of the Institut de France and was elected to the Académie des Beaux-Arts, where he took Seat #6 in the "Unattached" section. Later, he served as President of the Comité Français d'Histoire de l'Art (CFHA) and vice-president of the Commission du Vieux Paris. A widower, he married his second wife, the paleographer Marguerite Milliez (1918-2001), in 1956.
