= The Circus (Seurat) =

Painting by Georges Seurat

Le Cirque
- The Circus (English)
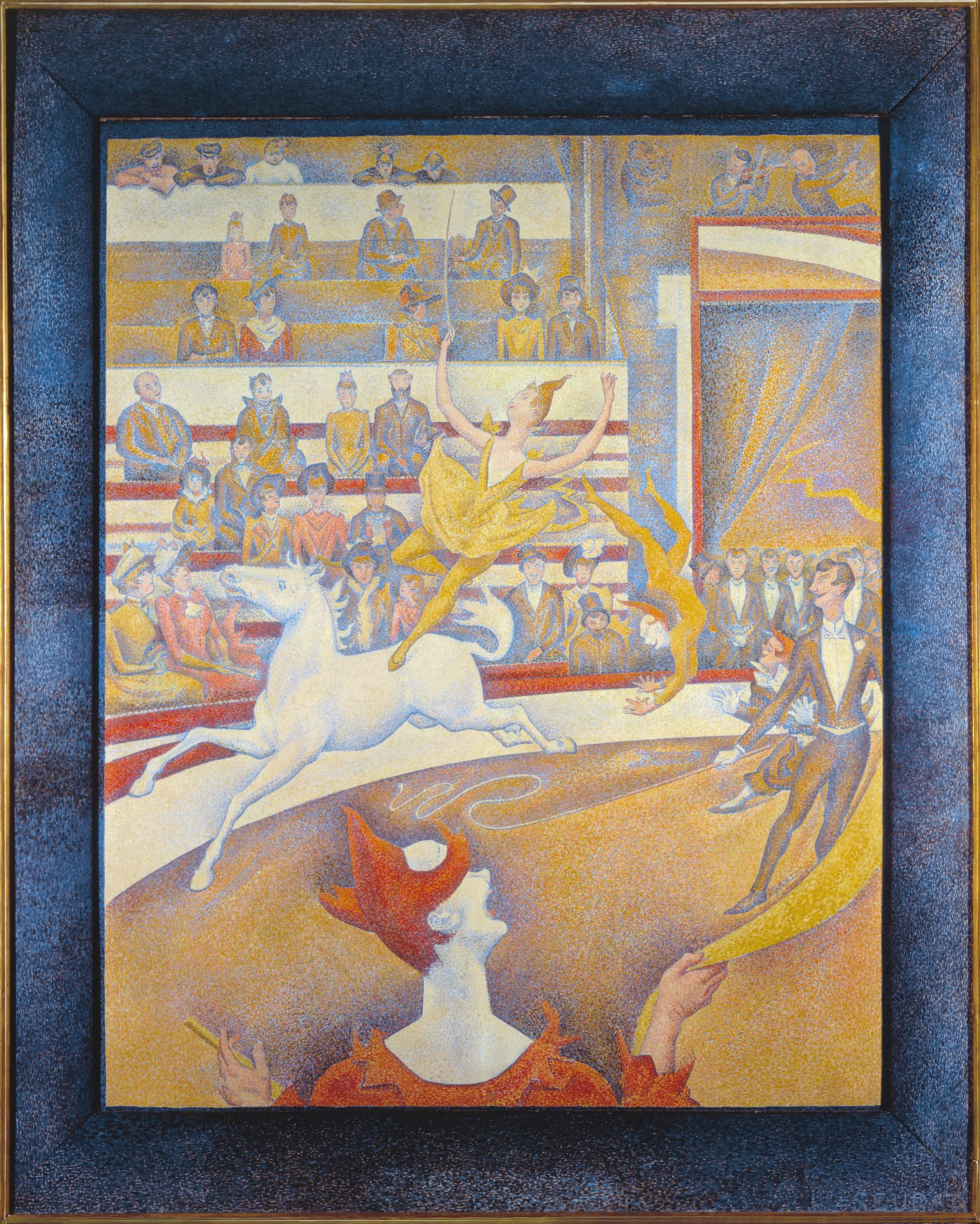
- Artist: Georges Seurat
- Year: 1890–91
- Medium: Oil on canvas
- Dimensions: 185 cm × 152 cm (72.8 in × 59.8 in)
- Location: Musée d'Orsay, Paris
- Website: Museum page

The Circus (French: Le Cirque) is an oil on canvas painting by Georges Seurat. It was his last painting, made in a Neo-Impressionist style in 1890–91, and remained unfinished at his death in March 1891. The painting is located at the Musée d'Orsay in Paris.

== Background ==
The painting was Seurat's third major work treating the theme of the circus, after his Parade (Circus sideshow) of 1887–88 and Le Chahut of 1889–90. It depicts a female performer standing on a horse at the Circus Fernando (renamed the Circus Médrano in 1890, after its most famous clown). The Circus Médrano was located at the corner of the Rue des Martyrs and the Boulevard de Rochechouart, close to Seurat's studio. It was a popular entertainment in Paris, depicted in the 1880s by other artists such as Renoir (for example, Acrobats at the Cirque Fernando (Francisca and Angelina Wartenberg)), Degas (for example, Miss La La at the Cirque Fernando) and Toulouse-Lautrec (for example, Equestrienne (At the Circus Fernando)).

Seurat makes use of Charles Henry's theories on the emotional and symbolic meaning of lines and colours, and the works of Chevreul and Ogden Rood on complementary colours. He was also influenced by Japanese prints, and the graphic works of Jules Chéret. The work is similar to chromolithograph Au cirque by Karl Gampenrieder, but it is not clear if Seurat had seen it.

== Description ==
The work measures 185 × 152 centimetres (73 × 60 in) (dimensions with frame painted by the artist: 232 x 198.5 cm). Seurat used a Neo-Impressionist Divisionist style, with pointillist dots creating the sense of other colours. The work is dominated by white and the three primary colours, mainly red and yellow with blue shading. A deeper blue border painted around the edge of the canvas, merging into a flat frame in the same shade of blue.

The painting is divided into two spaces, with the circus artists occupying the lower right, characterised by curves and spirals creating a sense of movement, and the audience occupying the upper left, confined to rows of benches. The audience shows the distinctions between social classes sitting in rows, from the well-dressed higher classes near the front (sitting in the front row, in a top hat, is Seurat's friend and fellow painter Charles Angrand) to the lower classes in the gallery at the back.

A sense of space is created by the whiteface clown in the foreground, facing away from the viewer, and the tiers of bleachers. Another pair of clowns are tumbling to the right behind the ringmaster.

Seurat made few preparatory studies, concentrating on creating dynamic lines and using few colours.

== Reception ==
Le Cirque was first exhibited at the Salon des Indépendants in March 1891, in an unfinished state. The work remained unfinished at Seurat's death a few days later: in places, the white ground and a grid of blue lines used by Seurat to create his composition are still visible. Early critics complained that the subjects were stiff, like automatons. Others later saw it as a forerunner of Cubism.

The painting was returned to Seurat's mother after the exhibition in 1891, and she hung it in the room in the Boulevard de Magenta where he had died. The painting was acquired by Paul Signac around 1900, and then by American collector John Quinn, who donated the painting to the Louvre in 1927. It was exhibited at the Musée du Luxembourg, the Musée National d'Art Moderne and the Galerie du Jeu de Paume. It has been located at the Musée d'Orsay since 1977.

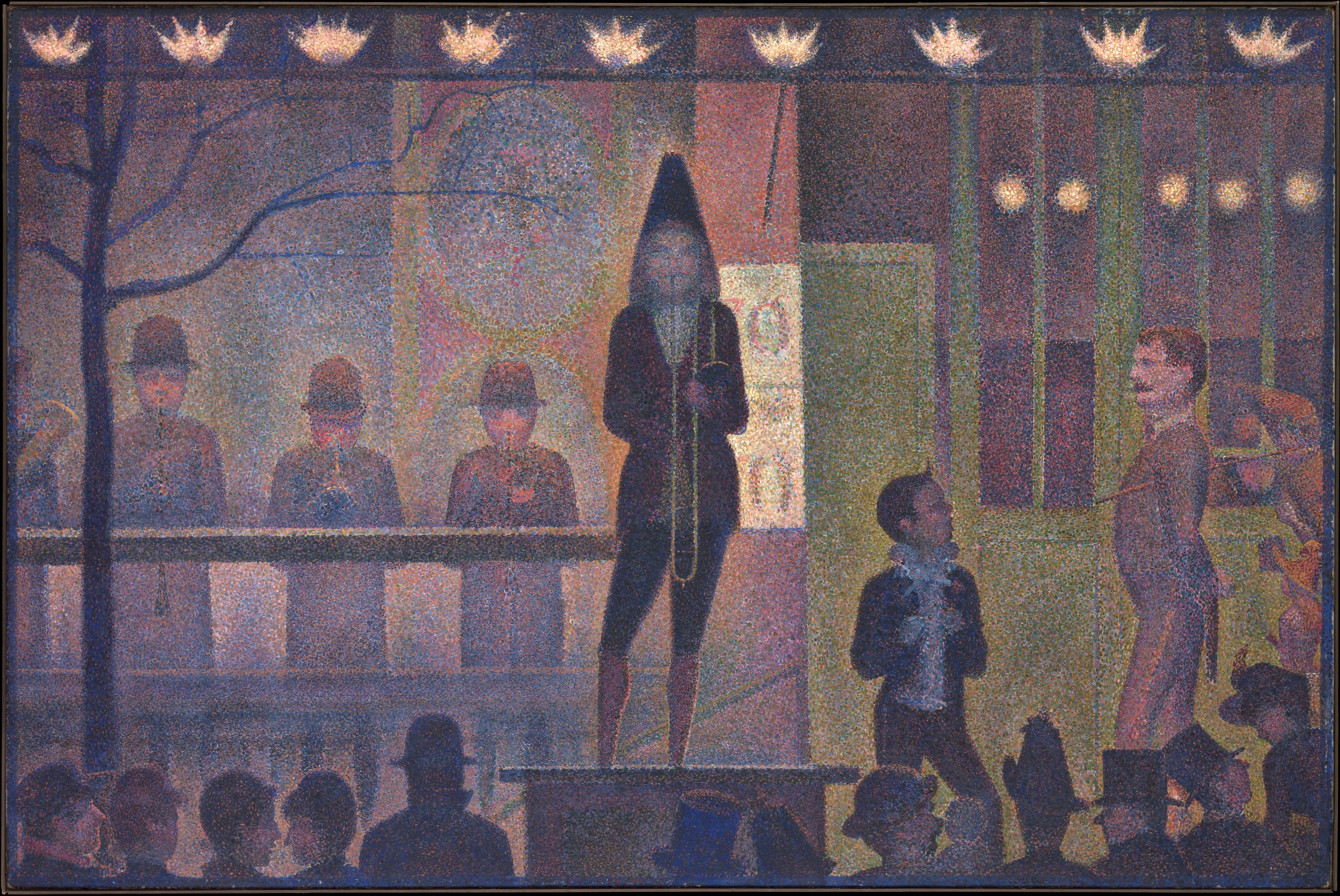
Parade de cirque (Circus sideshow), 1887–88

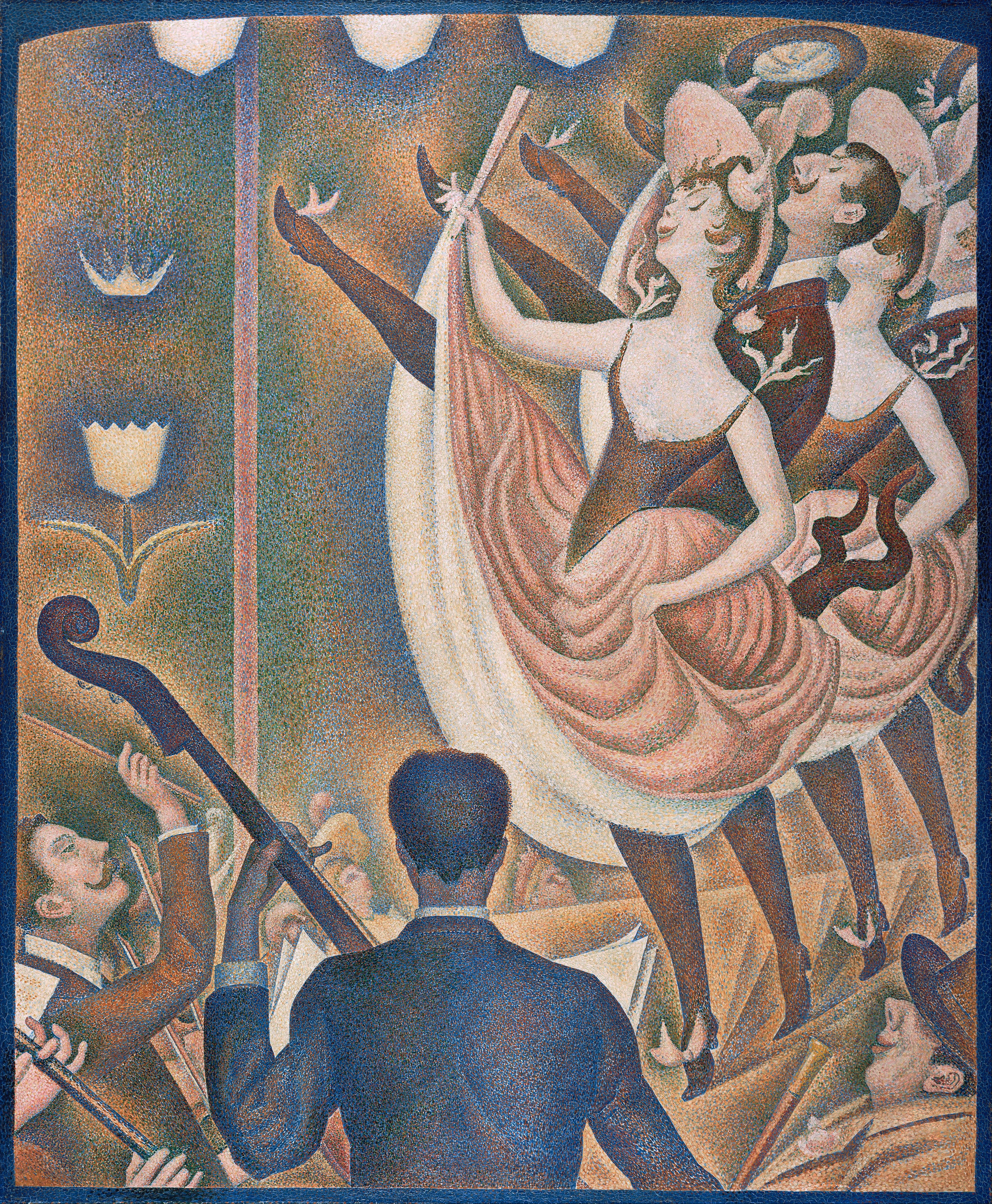
Le Chahut, 1889–90

== See also ==
- List of paintings by Georges Seurat
