= Acrobats at the Cirque Fernando (Francisca and Angelina Wartenberg) =

1879 painting by Pierre-Auguste Renoir

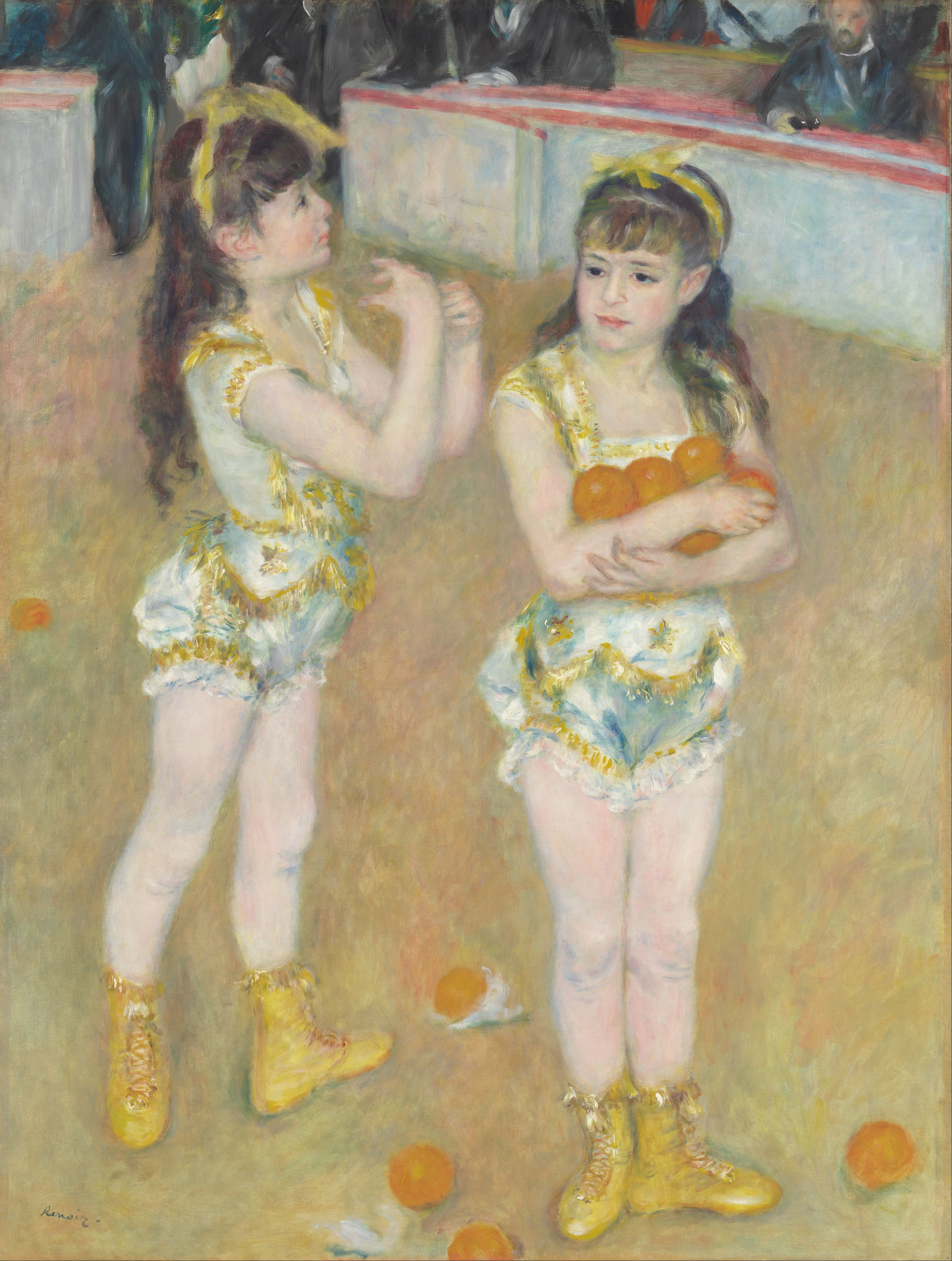
- Artist: Pierre-Auguste Renoir
- Year: 1879
- Medium: Oil on canvas
- Movement: Impressionism
- Dimensions: 131.2 cm × 99.2 cm (51.7 in × 39.1 in)
- Location: Art Institute of Chicago, Chicago
- Accession: 1922.440

Acrobats at the Cirque Fernando (Francisca and Angelina Wartenberg) is an 1879 oil painting by the French Impressionist artist Pierre-Auguste Renoir. It shows two young circus performers at the end of their act: one girl bows to the audience while the other holds oranges that spectators have thrown into the ring. The models have been identified as the sisters Francisca and Angelina Wartenberg, members of an itinerant German acrobatic troupe, and the setting is thought to be the Cirque Fernando in Montmartre, Paris.

The painting was first exhibited in Paris in 1879 and again at the seventh Impressionist exhibition in 1882. The dealer Paul Durand-Ruel sold it in 1892 to the Chicago businessman Potter Palmer, and it became the favorite painting of his wife, Bertha Palmer. It has been in the collection of the Art Institute of Chicago since 1922.

== Background ==
In 1868 Renoir had painted the clown James Bollinger Mazutreek for a café owner at the Cirque Napoléon (now the Cirque d'hiver). The Cirque Fernando completed its permanent building in Montmartre, at the corner of the boulevard de Rochechouart and the rue des Martyrs, in June 1875, near Renoir's studio on the rue Saint-Georges. Renoir's biographer Georges Rivière recalled that the circus amused Renoir but that its uncertain lighting, which distorted faces and gestures, repelled him; the acrobats he did paint were shown in daylight. Edgar Degas painted Miss La La at the Cirque Fernando in the same year as Renoir's picture, and the circus was also depicted by Georges Seurat and Pablo Picasso.

== Subjects ==
The identities of the models were long forgotten. Rivière called the girls jugglers (jongleuses), and Renoir recalled painting "a Circus, with little girls juggling oranges". The sitters were identified through a 1938 letter from Angelina Wartenberg, then living in London, to her niece in California. Angelina wrote that the picture showed her and her sister Francisca "when we were beginning our careers as Circus Kids", adding: "I am the greedy one, and collar most of the oranges the public pelted us with."

According to the Art Institute's 2014 catalogue, the sisters were the eldest children in a family of Franco-German gymnasts whose acts included a human pyramid. Angelina was baptized in Berlin in 1864; after the family became naturalized British citizens in 1889 she stayed in London, while Francisca performed in the United States and married an instructor at San Francisco's Olympic Club. In 1879 Francisca would have been seventeen and Angelina fourteen, although Renoir made them look younger. Oranges, often thrown by children, were a customary tribute to outstanding circus acts.

== Description ==
The girls are seen from above at close range, a view the Frick Collection likened to one "observed through opera glasses from one of the cheaper seats". Because the barrier of the ring sits high in the composition, only one spectator's face is visible, along with the legs of attendants and other performers. Renoir worked in thin, translucent layers of paint, using Naples yellow for the flesh and violet for the contours of the limbs. The yellow of the costumes recurs in the floor of the ring, in a palette dominated by yellows and oranges.

According to the Art Institute, the sisters posed in Renoir's studio so that he could paint them in daylight. John Collins, author of the museum's catalogue entry, notes that their poses echo the third and fourth positions of the feet in ballet rather than conveying how they performed. Infrared images show that Renoir adjusted the figures' legs as he worked, and a preparatory chalk drawing includes a clown at lower right who is absent from the painting.

== Title and date ==
In Renoir's lifetime the painting was recorded as Les Petites acrobates, Les Saltimbanques and Au Cirque. A list of works in the 1925 English translation of Ambroise Vollard's book on Renoir called it Young Girl Jugglers, Cirque Fernando and dated it 1875; this was the first time the circus was named as the setting. Proposed dates ranged from 1868 to 1882; the accepted date of 1879 is based on the first exhibition. The Art Institute used the title Two Little Circus Girls for more than fifty years; the present title derives from research by Colin B. Bailey for a 1997 exhibition.

== Provenance ==
Renoir deposited the painting with Durand-Ruel in Paris in April 1881 and sold it to the dealer in May 1882 for 2,000 francs. Durand-Ruel sold it to Potter Palmer on May 11, 1892, for 8,000 francs. Bertha Palmer displayed it in her bedroom; according to the Art Institute, it was her favorite painting and she took it with her when she traveled in Europe. After her death in 1918 it passed to her sons, Honoré and Potter Palmer Jr., and it was given to the Art Institute in 1922.

== Exhibition history ==
The painting was first shown from June 19 to July 3, 1879, at the Paris offices of the periodical La Vie moderne, in an exhibition consisting mainly of pastels. It was included in the seventh Impressionist exhibition in March 1882, and was shown in New York in 1886 and at Durand-Ruel's Paris gallery in 1892. Later exhibitions included the art exhibit of the 1936 Great Lakes Exposition at the Cleveland Museum of Art and Renoir's Portraits: Impressions of an Age (Ottawa, Chicago and Fort Worth, 1997–1998). In 2012 it was one of nine paintings in Renoir, Impressionism, and Full-Length Painting, organized by Bailey at the Frick Collection, and in 2024 it was lent to the National Gallery, London, for Discover Degas and Miss La La.

== Reception ==
Writing in La Vie moderne in 1879, the artist's brother Edmond Renoir said that the painter had "captured the actual movement of the two children" and that "it's just the way they walked, bowed, smiled in the circus ring". Later writers have questioned this view: the art historian Douglas Druick argued that the warm flesh tones suggest the girls were painted in natural light rather than circus lighting, and Collins describes their balletic presentation as an instance of what Bailey called Renoir's "aesthetic leveling". Robert L. Herbert, reviewing Renoir's Portraits, counted it among works that "would not readily be considered portraits", because the sitters "were asked to pose for genre pictures". In 2024 Anna McNay of Studio International wrote that Renoir "makes them look much younger, and they pose, rather statically", and noted that their costumes are identical to Miss La La's.

In a 2015 Country Life feature, the children's author Jacqueline Wilson named it her favorite painting and said that it had prompted her books about the Victorian circus girl Hetty Feather.

== See also ==
- List of paintings by Pierre-Auguste Renoir
