= Miss La La =

Expert aerialist

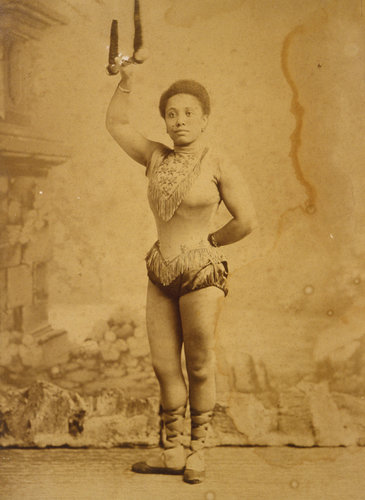
- Born: Anna Olga Albertina Brown; 21 April 1858; Szczecin
- Died: 21 March 1945; Ixelles
- Other name: Venus of the Tropics
- Occupations: Acrobat, trapeze artist, circus performer, stunt performer, aerialist

Miss La La (April 21, 1858 - March 21, 1945) was an Afro-German aerialist who served as muse to Edgar Degas and was depicted in his 1879 painting Miss La La at the Cirque Fernando. She was also depicted in a poster for the Folies Bergère. She was the star of Troupe Kaira, a traveling circus act, and performed with the Cirque Fernando, based in Montmartre.

== Early life ==
La La was born either Anna Olga Albertina Brown or Olga Brown in the then German/Prussian territory of Stettin (now Szczecin) to a black father and white mother. She was the fifth child of Marie Christine Borchardt, a German Jew (related to the circus owner Willy Borchardt), and William Wilhelm Brown, most likely a freedman from USA or United Kingdom. All five children were baptized in a Lutheran church in Stettin-Bredow.

== Career ==
La La began touring as a child, approximately around age nine, when her mother placed her in the circus. An article claimed that fourteen year old Anna Olga traveled to New York, to hone her circus craft before officially debuting in 1879. At age 21, La La became the subject of Edgar Degas's sketches, leading to his 1879 painting Miss La La at the Cirque Fernando. She used multiple stage names throughout her career including Olga the Negress, Venus of the Tropics, African Princess, and Olga the Mulatto. She was also billed as La Femme Canon, La Mulatresse-Canon, and Black Venus. She played venues such as the Folies Bergère in Paris, the Royal Aquarium in London, and the Gaiety Theatre in Manchester. Olga often performed in duet with Graetz-born Theophila Szterker as Olga and Kaira, "Black and White Butterflies". With Troupe Kaira, La La performed a flying trapeze and human cannonball act. One of her signature acts involved being "pulled up to the height of the circus tent by biting down on a rope." The feat was performed at the height of 200 feet. Another signature stunt involved hoisting other people or a 200-pound cannon with her teeth. She was also known for her stunt of being hoisted up to her trapeze by her teeth. In 1888 Theophila died following a rehearsal trapeze accident, and after that La La retired from the circus.

== Marriage and family ==
La La married African-American circus contortionist Emanuel "Manuel" Woodson in 1888. The couple had three daughters who also became performers, forming a trio called The Three Keziahs. By the time World War I broke, the family likely lived in Brussels. Following Emanuel's death in 1915, Olga applied for a visa to enter the United States.

== Legacy ==
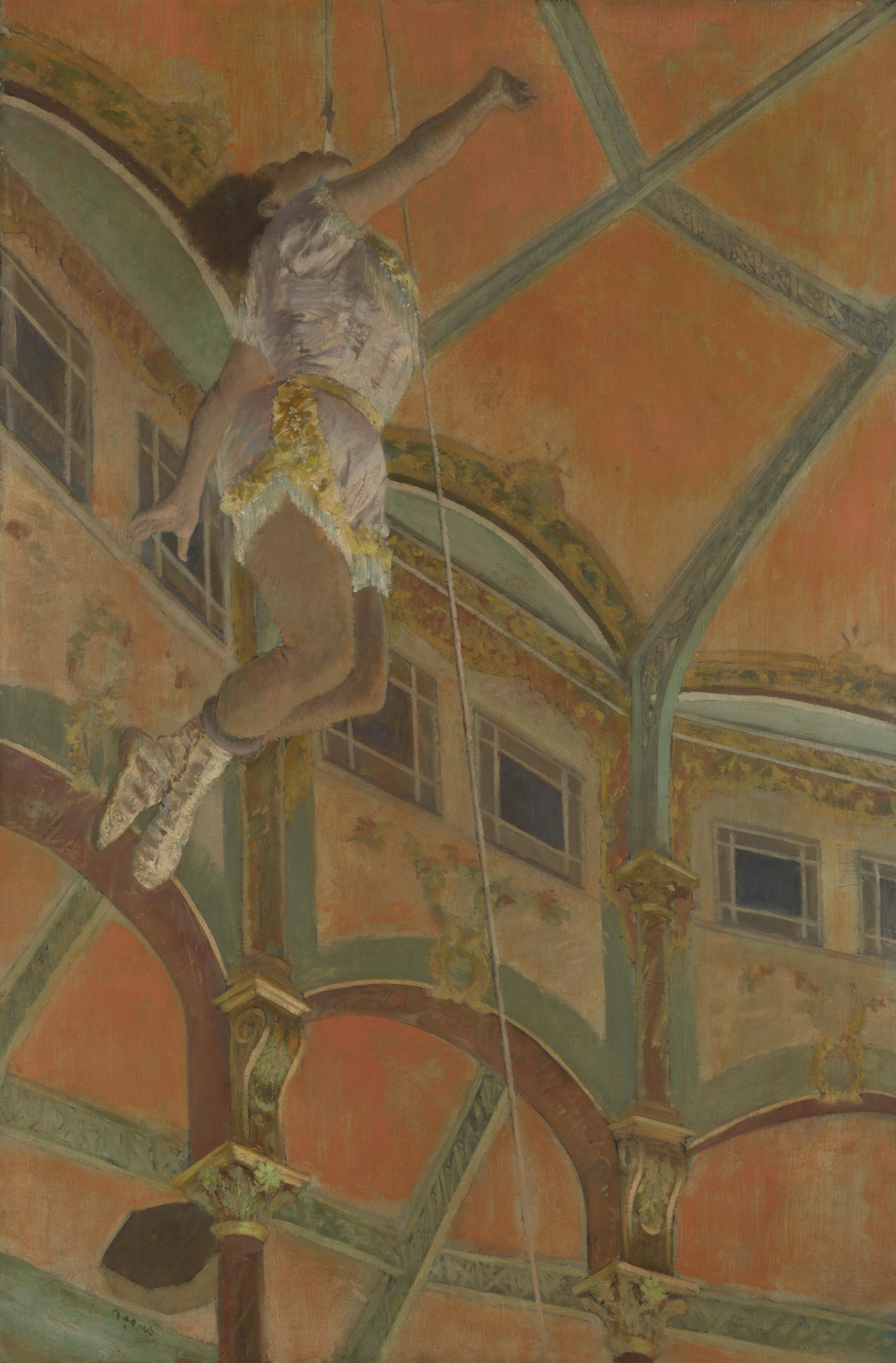
Miss La La at the Cirque Fernando, painted by Edgar Degas in 1879

La La is the subject of various articles including ones in The Guardian and the New York Times as well as the 2007 scholarly work Miss La La's Teeth: Reflections on Degas and Race. Edgar Degas's portrait of her hangs in the National Gallery in London, England. Since 1937, the portrait has appeared in a variety of exhibitions at a number of venues, including the J. Paul Getty Museum in Los Angeles and the Morgan Library & Museum in New York. In 2018, the portrait was loaned to the Weston Park Museum in Sheffield, England for an exhibit about black circus performers in the series Circus! Show of Shows. From Oct. 2018 through February 2019, the portrait appeared in Posing Modernity: The Black Muse from Manet to Matisse and Beyond, an exhibit at the Miriam and Ira D. Wallach Art Gallery at Columbia University, curated by Dr. Denise Murrell. In 2024 the National Gallery held an exhibition 'Discover Degas & Miss La La' which included earlier drawings by Degas together with photographs and posters telling the story of Miss La La.
