= The Waitress (Manet) =

1879 painting by Édouard Manet

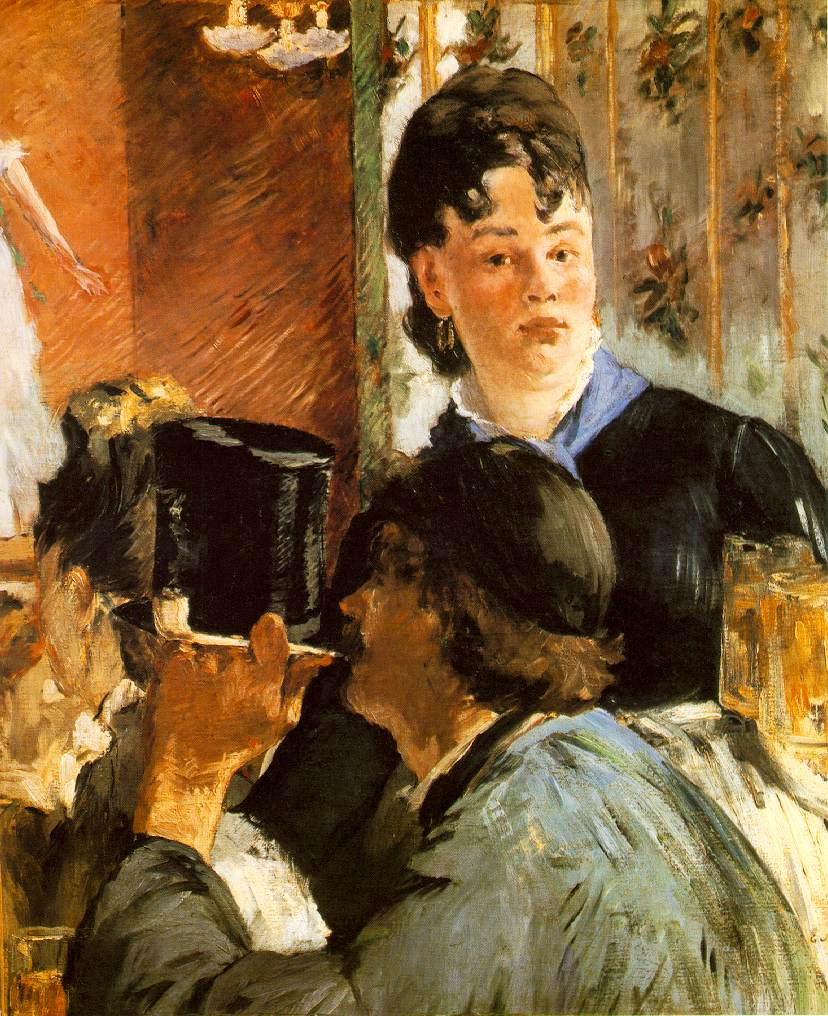
- Artist: Édouard Manet
- Year: 1879
- Medium: Oil on canvas
- Dimensions: 77 cm × 64.5 cm (30 in × 25.4 in)
- Location: Musée d'Orsay, Paris
- Accession: RF 1959 4
- Website: www.musee-orsay.fr/en/artworks/la-serveuse-de-bocks-1137

The Waitress (French - La Serveuse de bocks) is an 1879 oil on canvas painting by Édouard Manet. It directly relates to his Corner of a Café-Concert (National Gallery) and some art historians consider it to be a secondary version or preparatory work for Corner.

== See also ==
- List of paintings by Édouard Manet
- 1879 in art
