= Great Lakes Exposition =

Historic fair in Cleveland, Ohio

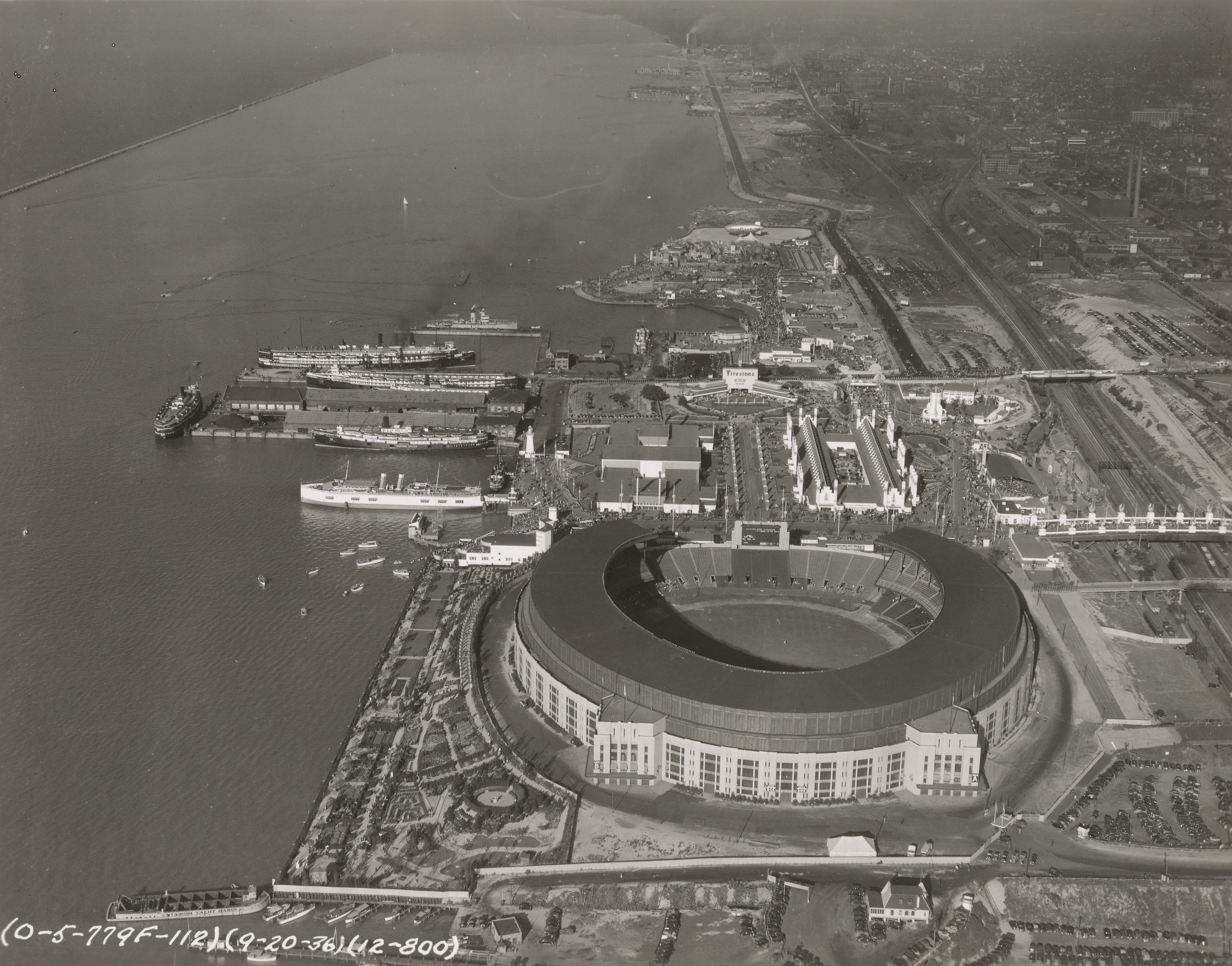
- Aerial view of Cleveland Stadium and the exposition grounds in 1936

Overview
- BIE-class: Unrecognized exposition
- Name: Great Lakes Exposition
- Visitors: 4 million (season 1) and 7 million (season 2)

Location
- Country: United States
- City: Cleveland, Ohio

Timeline
- Opening: June 27, 1936 (season 1)
- Closure: October 5, 1936 (season 1)

The Great Lakes Exposition (also known as the World Fair of 1936) was held in Cleveland, Ohio, in the summers of 1936 and 1937, along the Lake Erie shore north of downtown. The fair commemorated the centennial of Cleveland's incorporation as a city. Conceived as a way to energize a city hit hard by the Great Depression, it highlighted the progress that had been achieved in the Great Lakes region in the last 100 years and indicated the path for future progress. Covering over 135 acres of Cleveland's lakefront, it featured numerous attractions, including rides, sideshows, botanical gardens, cafes, art galleries, and much more. Similar to the Chicago World's Fair, the exposition also wanted to expose visitors to other countries' cultures, celebrate American industry, and promote local businesses. Although the Great Lakes Exposition was not as much of a world fair as the Chicago World's Fair was, the exposition drew 4 million visitors in its first season, and 7 million by the end of its second and final season in September 1937—a total of 13 million visitors.

== Construction ==
It featured a subway that connected the vast grounds with an area for pedestrians as well as for vehicles. The total cost of the exposition after two years was $70 million.

== Attractions ==
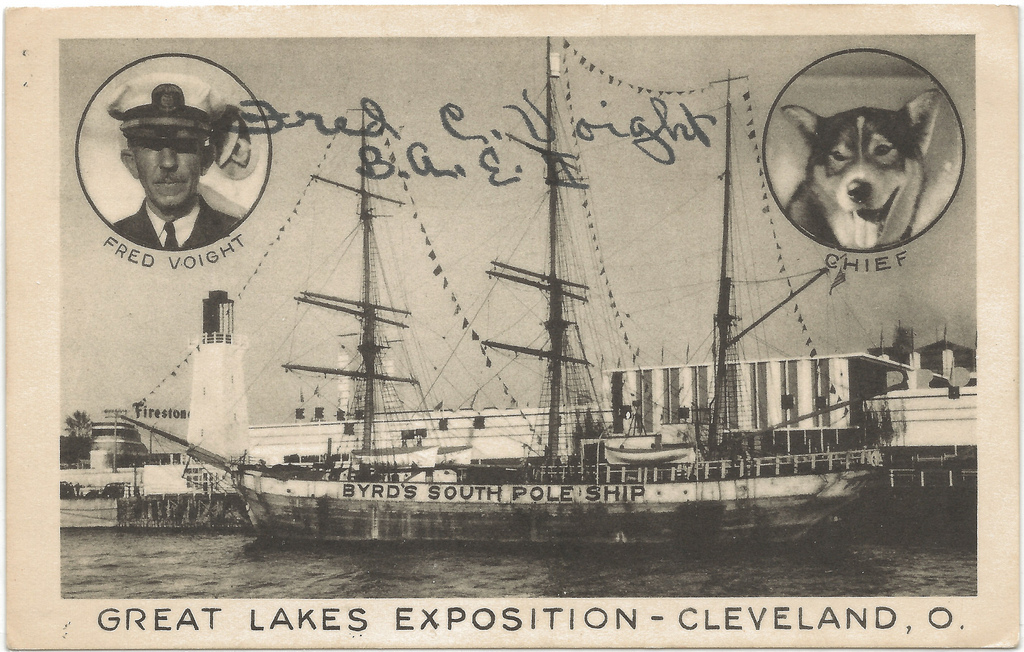
Postcard of the City of New York at the exposition

=== Midway ===
The Midway was a big, central area in the exposition and encompassed many of the attractions including rides, sideshows, a Court of Presidents, an Automotive building, an art gallery, a marine theater, horticultural gardens, and a Hall of Progress, which had a television theater.

=== Aquacade ===
Added in the second year of the exhibition in 1937, Billy Rose's Aquacade put on water ballet shows and was the most popular attraction. Stretched out to Lake Erie, the aquacade had a 5000-seat theater-restaurant where the audience could dine while watching synchronized swimming, diving, and performances by Olympic champion swimmers Eleanor Holm and Johnny Weissmuller. The show featured 4 episodes: "A Beach in California," "Coney Island," "A Beach in Florida," and "The Shores of Lake Erie". Although it was the most popular attraction at the Great Lake Exposition, it became more well known at the 1939 New York World's Fair.

=== "Streets of the World" ===
The "Streets of the World" was an exhibit created to expose visitors to other countries' cultures and featured cafes and bazaars inspired by the countries they represented. Food samples, entertainment, and goods from over 40 countries were all provided on the "Streets of the World".

=== Business Exhibits ===
Although the exposition had no over all theme, "The Romance of Iron and Steel," became the unofficial exhibition theme.

To promote their businesses, companies like White Motor Company, The Standard Oil Company (Ohio), Firestone Tire and Rubber Company, Sherwin Williams, Goodyear Tire and Rubber Company, Higbee's department store, and General Electric were represented at the exposition. Standard Oil had its very own exhibit and provided souvenir maps of the city, Higbee's had a store on site and an impressive tower, General Electric promoted its new fluorescent lights, and Goodyear provided blimp rides for visitors at the cost of $3.

=== Unusual Exhibits ===
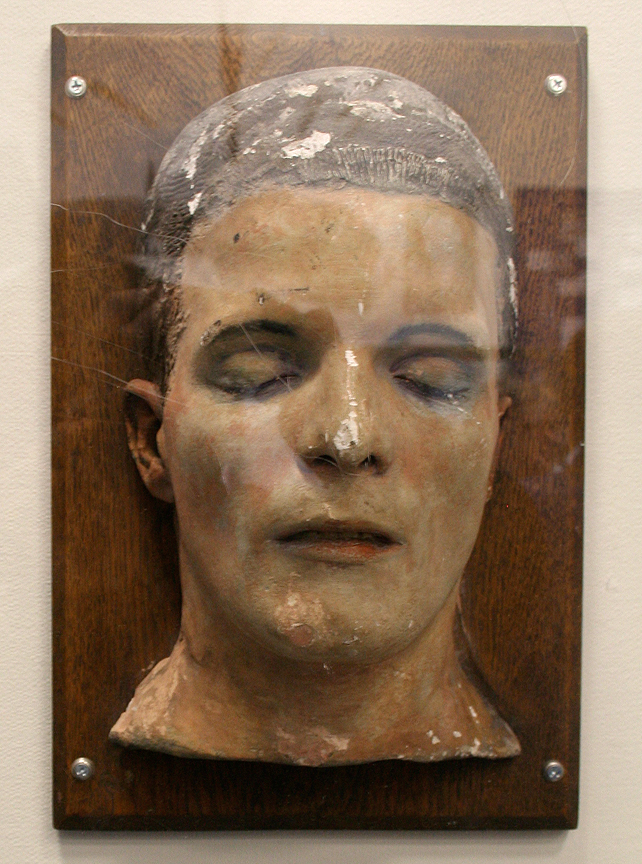
Torso Murder Death Mask on exhibit

=== Other ===
Another attraction was a floating stage on the current site of the Great Lakes Science Center; the stage was home to jazz concerts by the Bob Crosby Orchestra.

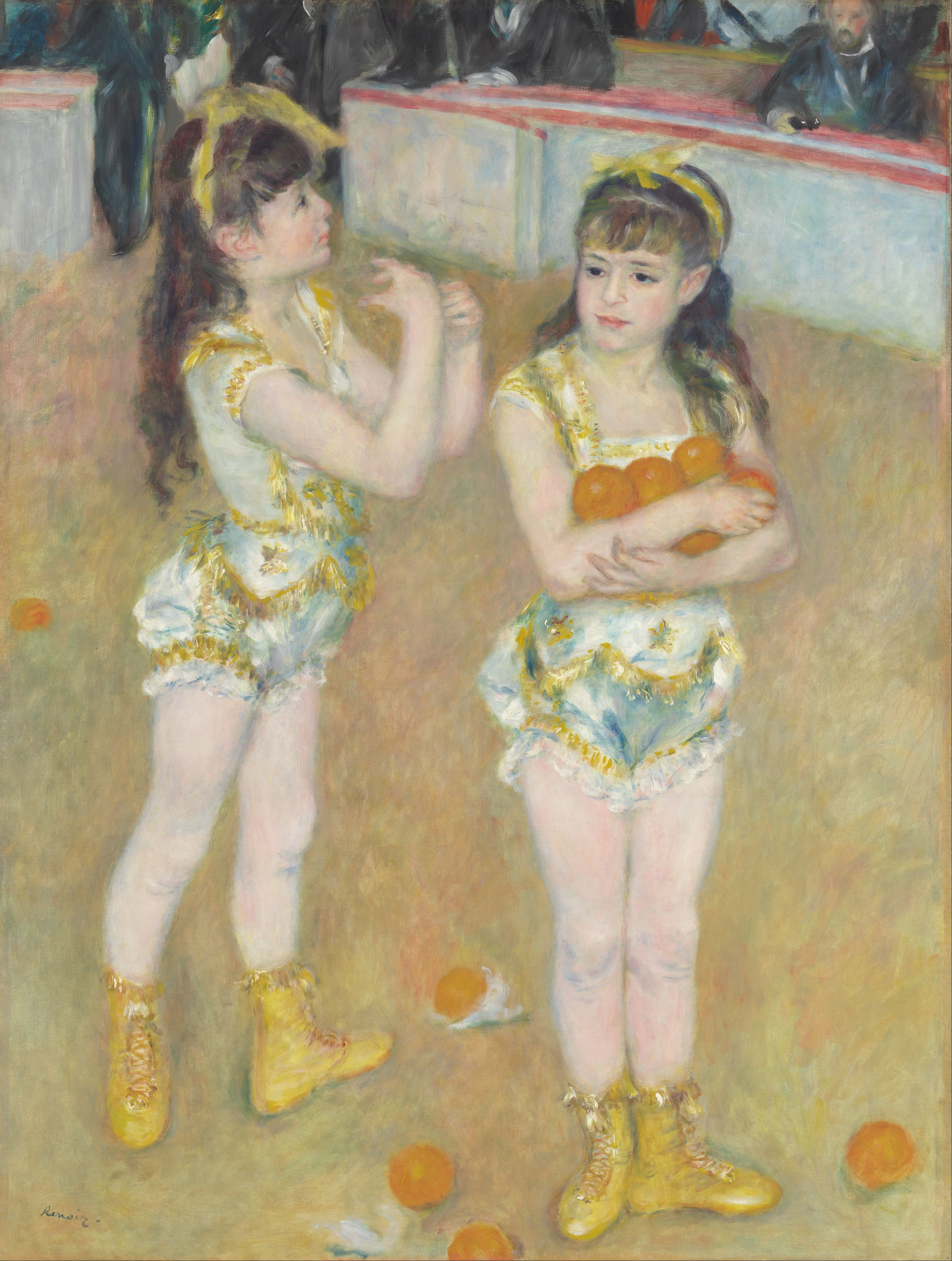
A Renoir, Acrobats at the Cirque Fernando was displayed at the exhibition

== Post Exposition ==
The exposition was dismantled quickly, taken down right after closing day on September 26, 1937. Only the Donald Gray Gardens were left standing behind Cleveland Stadium until 1997 when construction started on Cleveland Browns Stadium on the same site. The total number of visitors after both summers was 7 million (compared to Chicago's exposition of 27 million total visitors) and was less than hoped for. Any plans for permanent recreation facilities along the lakeside were not achieved.

== Conclusion ==
Although the Great Lakes Exposition gained some international attention, it never became a world fair. The area of town that was used for the vast exposition is now home to the Great Lakes Science Center and the Rock and Roll Hall of Fame.

== Legacy ==
In October 2010, the National Building Museum in Washington, D.C. opened an exhibition titled Designing Tomorrow: America's World’s Fairs of the 1930s. This exhibition, which was available for view until September 2011, prominently featured the Great Lakes Exposition.

== See also ==
- Cleveland Centennial half dollar
