= Claude Olry de Loriande =

17th-century French engraver, poet and playwright

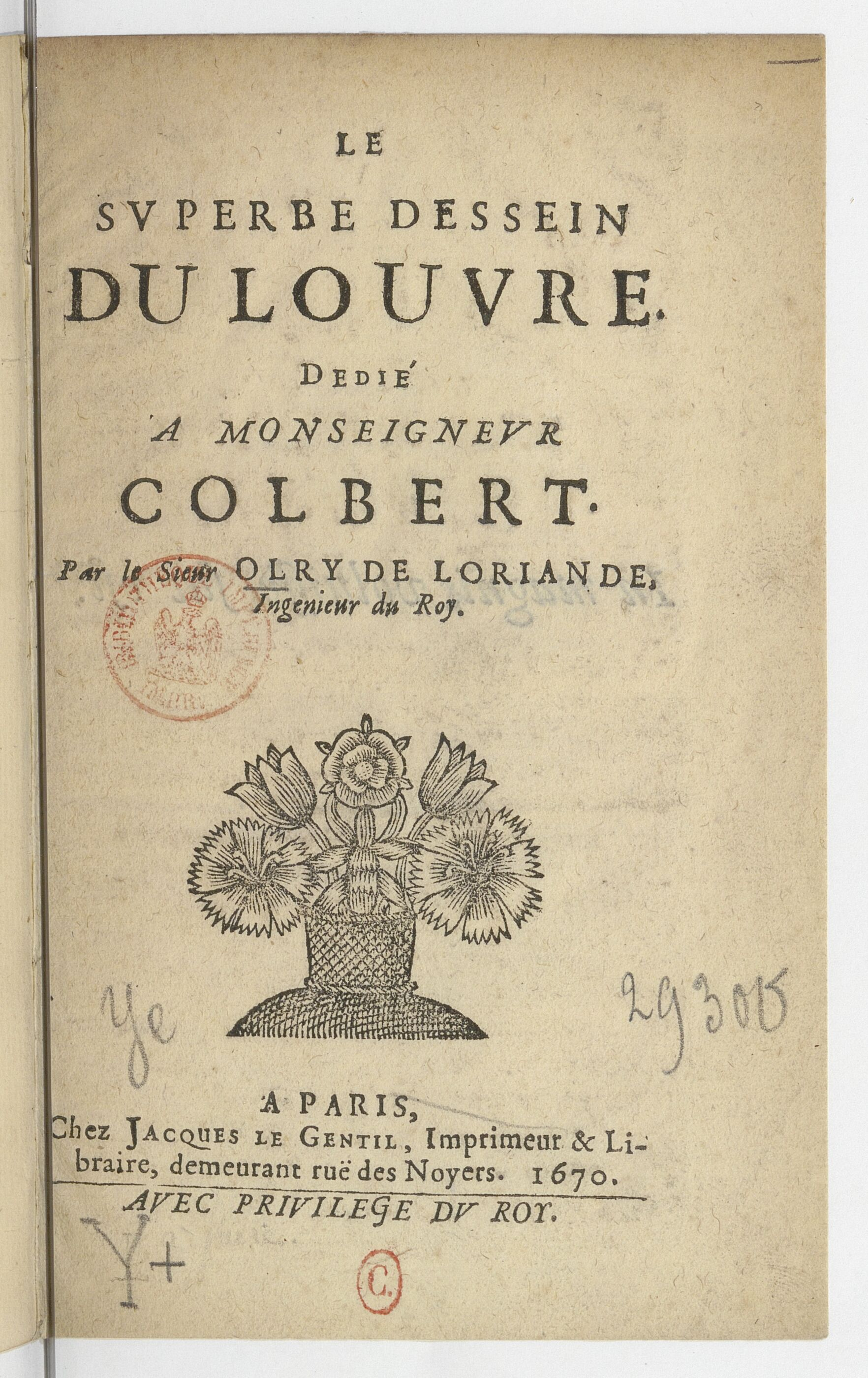
Le superbe dessein du Louvre, a poem by Claude Olry de Loriande in praise of the Louvre Colonnade and dedicated to Jean-Baptiste Colbert

Claude Olry de Loriande was a 17th-century French engraver, poet and playwright. His work as an engraver and poet was closely associated with his contemporary, the French architect François Le Vau. Both Le Vau and Olry de Loriande held the title "Ingénieur du Roy" during the reign of Louis XIV.

== Literary works ==
Olry de Loriande published a play with the title Le Heros très-chrestien (Paris, 1669). Henry Carrington Lancaster, historian of 17th-century French plays, writes: "The plot is romantic except towards the end, when the religious element becomes important. It seems related to the legend of Saint George and the Dragon. The structure is amateurish."

Olry de Loriande also published a long poem in praise of the Louvre Colonnade with the title Le superbe dessein du Louvre (Paris, 1670). The poem was dedicated to Jean-Baptiste Colbert, who oversaw the design process as Surintendant des Bâtiments du Roi, and credits François Le Vau as a designer of the Colonnade.

== Engravings ==
Olry de Loriande engraved many of François Le Vau's architectural designs, including for the Château de Lignières (1654–1660), the Château de Bercy (begun 1658), the Château de Montpipeau, the Palais des Tuileries (1664), and a project for the Louvre Colonnade (1664 or 1667/68?).

List of engravings by Claude Olry de Loriande
Building	Image	Description	Ref
Château de Lignières		Plan of the ground floor	
Château de Lignières		Courtyard façade	
Château de Lignières		Gallery façade on the courtyard	
Château de Lignières		Garden façade	
Château de Lignières	Image missing	Design of the facade on one of the sides of the main building of the château overlooking the gardens	
Château de Bercy		Plan of the ground floor	
Château de Bercy		Plan of the main floor	
Château de Bercy		Bird's eye view of the entrance front	
Château de Bercy		Bird's eye view of the garden front	
Château de Bercy		Elevation of the courtyard façade between the end pavilions	
Château de Bercy		Elevation of the garden façade between the end pavilions	
Château de Bercy		Elevation of one of the end pavilions facing the garden	
Château de Montpipeau		Bird's-eye view of the entrance front (project?)	
Château de Montpipeau	Image missing	Design of the façade with the two pavilions and main building adjacent to the garden	
Château de Montpipeau	Image missing	Profile of the main building at the level of the staircase, showing the faces of one of the sides facing the courtyard	
Château de Montpipeau	Image missing	Design of the main facade with the central pavilion facing the courtyard between the two semicircular wings.	
Château de Montpipeau	Image missing	Design of the main facade with the central pavilion facing the garden between the two side pavilions	
Palais des Tuileries	Images missing	Four engravings depicting changes made by Louis Le Vau in 1664	
East wing of the Louvre		Elevation of the east façade of the central pavilion (project)	
East wing of the Louvre		Elevation of the east façade of one of the end pavilions (project)	
East wing of the Louvre		Section north of the central pavilion, viewed looking south (project)	
East wing of the Louvre		Plan of the central pavilion and a portion of each adjoining wing at the level of the ground floor except for the east wall, which depicts the columns at the level of the main-floor peristyle (project)	

== Bibliography ==
- Berger, Robert W. (1993). The Palace of the Sun: The Louvre of Louis XIV. University Park: The Pennsylvania State University Press. ISBN 9780271008479.
- Feldmann, Dietrich (1996). "Le Vau", vol. 19, pp. 262–268, in The Dictionary of Art, 34 volumes, edited by Jane Turner. New York: Grove. ISBN 9781884446009. Also available at Oxford Art Online (subscription required).
- Gargiani, Roberto (1998). Idea e costruzione del Louvre. Parigi cruciale nella storia dell'architettura moderna europea. Florence: Alinea. ISBN 8881252538.
- Hautecoeur, Louis (1924). "L'auteur de la colonnade du Louvre". Gazette des Beaux-Arts, series 5, vol. 9, pp. 151–168. Copy at Gallica.
- Hautecoeur, Louis (1927). L'histoire des châteaux du Louvre et des Tuileries, tels qu'ils furent nouvellement construits, amplifiés, embellis, sous le règne de Sa Majesté le Roi Louis XIV, dit le Grand... Paris and Brussels: Librairie Nationale d'Art et d'Histoire, G. Van Oest. OCLC 1748382.
- Hautecoeur, Louis (1948). Histoire de l'Architecture classique en France. Tome 2: Le Règne de Louis XIV. Paris: J. Picard. OCLC 489711032, 476619163.
- Lancaster, Henry Carrington (1936). A History of French Dramatic Literature in the Seventeenth Century. Part III: The Period of Molière 1652–1672. New York: Gordian Press (1966 reprint). OCLC 477005751.
- Laprade, Albert (1960). François d'Orbay: Architecte de Louis XIV. Paris: Éditions Vincent, Fréal. OCLC 562063179, 780531730, 1096782.
- Petzet, Michael (2000). Claude Perrault und die Architektur des Sonnenkönigs. Der Louvre König Ludwigs XIV. und das Werk Claude Perraults. Munich/Berlin: Deutscher Kunstverlag. ISBN 3422062645.
- Richards, T. (1887). "Vau (Louis le)", vol. 8, "Text to letter V", pp. 17–18, in The Dictionary of Architecture. London: Whiting. OCLC 8786597. See also: p. 18 at HathiTrust.
