= Boulevard Marguerite-de-Rochechouart =

Boulevard in Paris, France

Coordinates: 48°52′59″N 2°20′43″E

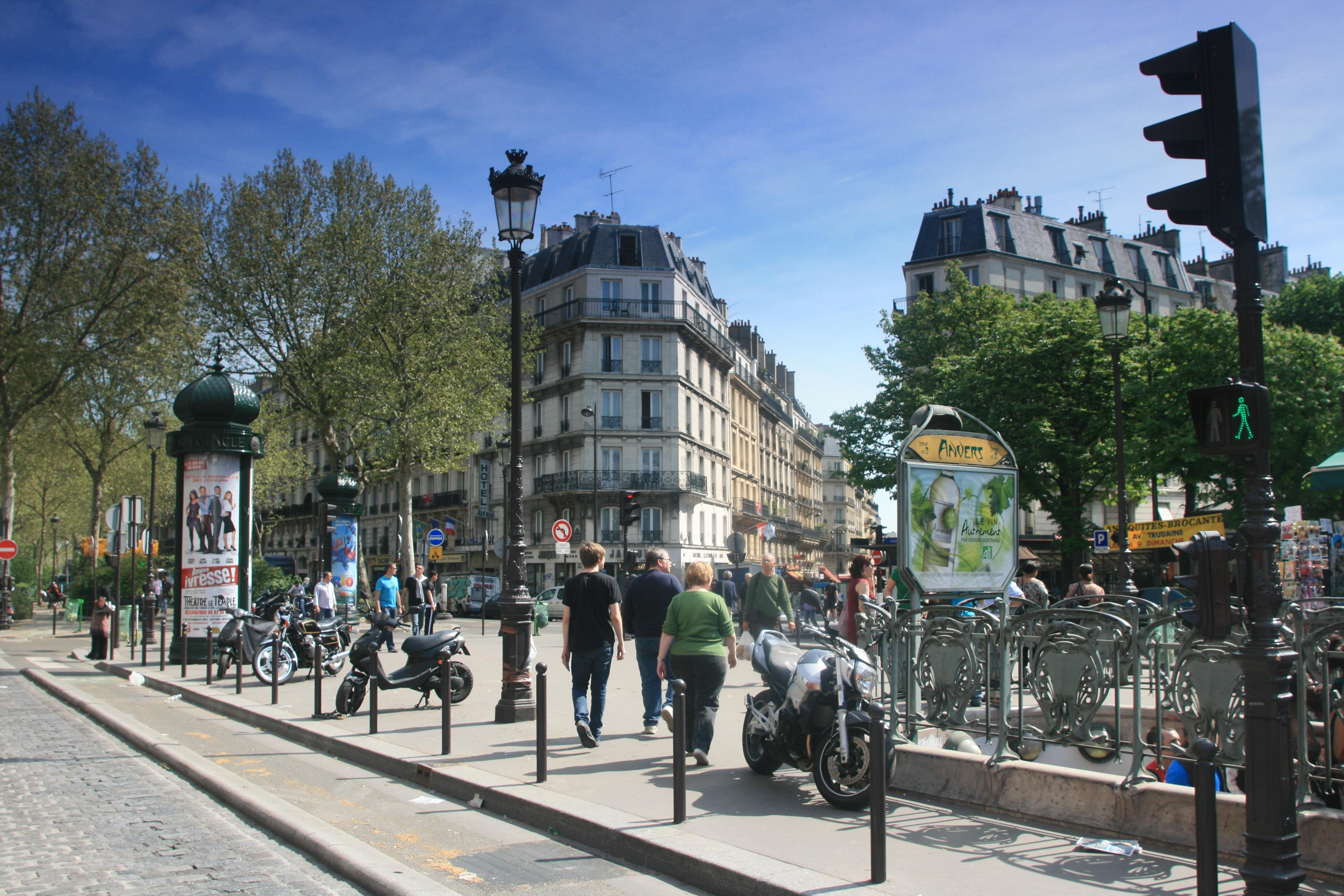
The boulevard in 2011

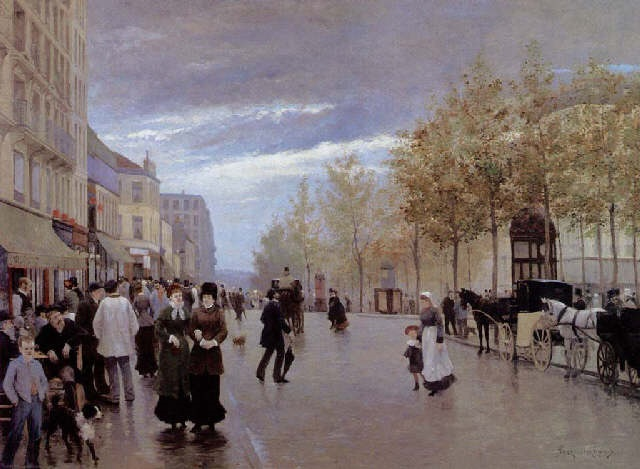
The boulevard in 1883

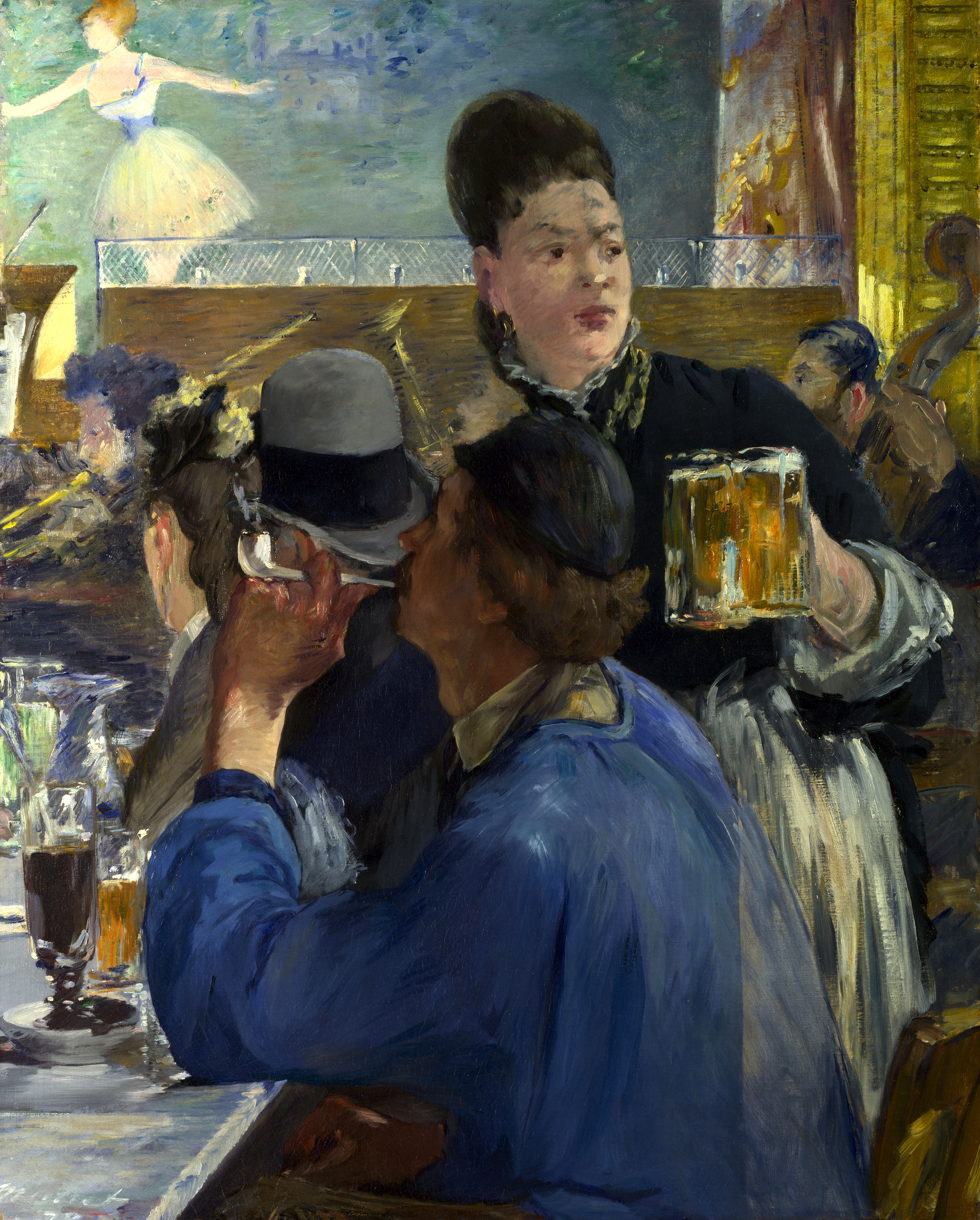
Corner of a Café-Concert, the right half of a painting of the Brasserie de Reichshoffen, Boulevard Marguerite-de-Rochechouart, Paris, by Édouard Manet circa 1879

Boulevard Marguerite-de-Rochechouart (French pronunciation: [bulvaʁ maʁɡəʁit də ʁɔʃəʃwaʁ]) is a boulevard in Paris, France, situated at the foot of Montmartre and to its south.

Like the neighbouring street, Rue Marguerite-de-Rochechouart, it is named after Marguerite de Rochechouart de Montpipeau (1665–1727), abbess of Montmartre. It is a result of the 1864 merging of the boulevards and chemins de ronde which followed the interior and exterior of the Wall of the Farmers-General. It has also been known as the Boulevard des Poissonniers, Chemin de ronde de Poissonnière and Chemin de ronde de Rochechouart. It is served by the Paris Metro stations Pigalle, Anvers and Barbès–Rochechouart.

== Sites ==
- No. 15: former site of the théâtre de la Gaîté-Rochechouart.
- No. 29: a pied-à-terre of the painter Gustave Caillebotte.
- No. 38: a atelier of the painter Fernand Piet.
- No. 45: site of the old Montmartre abattoir, then the collège Rollin (1876) and today the lycée Jacques-Decour.
- No. 55: former hôtel of the painter Ernest Hébert. The revenues from it now fund the Musée Hébert de la Tronche and the Musée national Ernest Hébert de Paris
- At no. 57 lived the famous polemicist Henri Rochefort – this house was also the last Paris studio of Renoir.
- At no. 57bis lived Eugénie Buffet, famous street singer.
- No. 63: former cirque Fernando, then Médrano.
- At no. 66 the composer Gustave Charpentier lived for 60 years.
- No. 72: former site of the Elysée Montmartre, popular ballroom originally dating back to 1807.
- No. 80: site of the théâtre de l'Elysée-Montmartre, now the le Trianon.
- No. 84: site of the famous cabaret Le Chat noir created by the painter Rodolphe Salis.
- No. 120: address of the concert hall Boule Noire and the adjoining cabaret La Cigale.

== Sources and references ==
- Jacques Hillairet, Dictionnaire historique des rues de Paris, Minuit, Paris, 1963 (ISBN 2-7073-1054-9)
