= Corner of a Café-Concert =

1879 painting by Édouard Manet

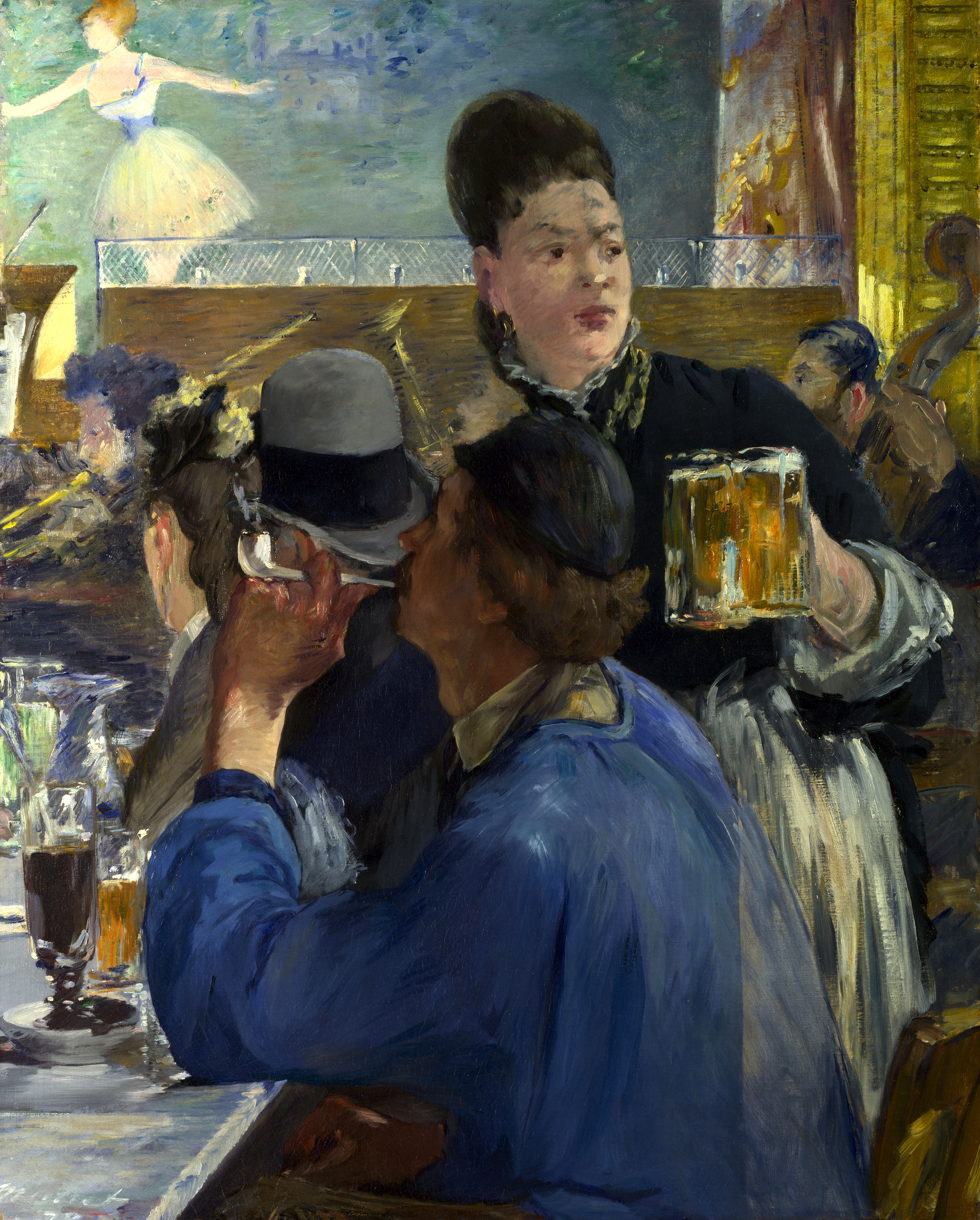
- Artist: Édouard Manet
- Year: c.1878-1879
- Medium: Oil on canvas
- Dimensions: 98 cm × 79 cm (39 in × 31 in)
- Location: National Gallery, London

Corner of a Café-Concert is an 1879 oil-on-canvas painting by Édouard Manet, now in the National Gallery, London. The painting was inspired by waitresses in the Brasserie de Reichshoffen (a beer hall) in Paris, and it depicts a waitress at work. Corner of a Café-Concert and Manet's At the Café are two halves of what was once a larger painting. Manet also created a related painting in The Waitress. Corner of a Café-Concert was controversial in Manet's time because of the waitress's assumed position as a prostitute.

== Production ==
=== Background ===
Corner of a Café-Concert is set in the Brasserie de Reichshoffen in Paris, where Manet was fascinated by the skill of the waitresses. Specifically, Manet admired how the waitresses were able to serve customers a beer while not spilling anything from the multiple beers held in the other hand. Manet felt that it was necessary to have a live model for his paintings set in public spaces, and he asked the most skilled waitress from the Reichshoffen to model for him. However, the waitress refused to pose for Manet unless her boyfriend accompanied her. The waitress' boyfriend is included in the painting as the man in blue with a pipe in the foreground. The studio work was blended with sketches that Manet completed at the Brasserie de Reichshoffen in order to complete the final painting. Corner of a Café-Concert was completed in the Swedish painter Otto Rosen's studio on the Rue d'Amsterdam, which Manet was using from July 1878 until the end of March 1879.

=== The two café-concerts ===
Édouard Manet, At the Café, 1878

In August 1878, Manet began a larger painting entitled Café-Concert de Reichshoffen that would later become Corner of a Café-Concert . While working on this larger painting, Manet cut it into two parts and developed each part independently. It is generally agreed that the left side become a painting titled At the Café, which was approximately two thirds of the original composition. The right side became Corner of a Café-Concert. Manet extended the painting by adding a strip of canvas about 7.5 inches wide to the right edge in order to situate the waitress more centrally in the composition. The prominent vertical line on the back of the man's smock reveals the edge of the original canvas. The line appeared as a result of using thinner paint, which has degraded more quickly with time, for the additional strip . X-rays of Corner of a Café-Concert reveal a patch on the left of the painting with a bottom horizontal line above the carafe on the table, which is believed to be a continuation of the window featured in At the Café. As such, At the Café is believed to include the original background of Café-Concert de Reichshoffen, and Corner of a Café-Concert is believed to be more extensively reworked than At the Café because of the addition of the stage, dancer, and orchestra.

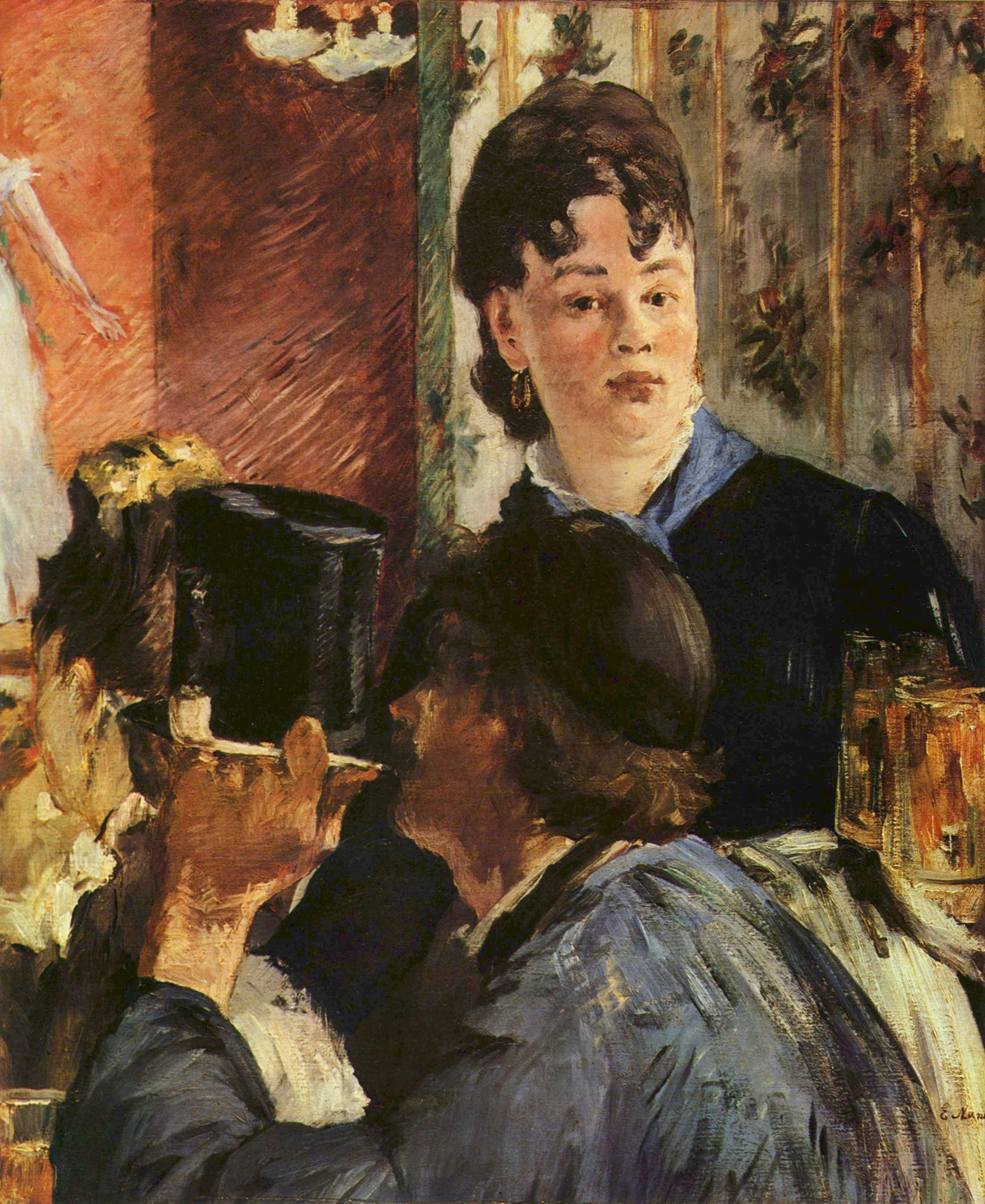
Édouard Manet, The Waitress, 1879

An alternative theory proposes that the larger Café-Concert de Reichshoffen was cut to form At the Café and The Waitress because both paintings are the same height. However, disproving this theory, the precise styles of Corner of a Café-Concert and At the Café are consistent with each other, while The Waitress features a looser style. In addition, the left edge of the tabletop in Corner of a Café-Concert matches the right edge of the tabletop in At the Café, and the shadows of the drinks on the table in Corner of a Café-Concert can be seen on the right edge of the table in At the Café. The height difference between Corner of a Café-Concert and At the Café appears to be due to Manet cutting a horizontal strip of canvas from the top of At the Café, reducing its height by 8.25 inches. Generally, Corner of a Café-Concert is viewed as a study for The Waitress because of the improved compositional focus of The Waitress, though some state that The Waitress was the preparatory study for Corner of a Café-Concert.

== Composition and analysis ==
Corner of a Café-Concert features Manet's technique of collapsing the distance between the foreground and background in order to generalize the setting to any brasserie. In addition, Manet edited some of background elements of the sketches in the final painting in order to clearly convey the setting and make it feel more modern.

The man in the foreground anchors the composition amidst the movement present in the scene. The man's blue smock, cap, and clay pipe matches the attire associated with the typical Parisian worker. Seated next to the man in the blue is a man wearing a gray hat, and farther into the background the profile of a woman is visible. This sequence of heads, each farther away than the last, gives the composition a sense of depth and imparts the perception of a crowded scene.

The performers of the café-concert are not the principal focus of the painting; rather, the waitress is. The stage is in the background, featuring a dancer or singer in white. To the left and right are musicians; fragments of a bass, violin bow, and trombone are visible. The other figures in the foreground are close together, but the waitress's brightly lit face is set apart. The waitress's head forms a pyramid with the two men's heads, and the raised hand of the man in blue is balanced by the beers held in the waitress's other hand. These symmetries ground the composition but also convey a sense of instability because of how fleeting the arrangement is.

== Contemporary critical reception ==
Corner of a Café-Concert was controversial in Manet's time because of the perceived indecency of the subject matter. The Brasserie de Reichshoffen was an example of a brasserie à femmes, a new type of beer hall that emerged in the late 1860s that hired women as waiters. The waitresses at such establishments were commonly associated with prostitution. Manet's depiction of a brasserie à femmes is atypical in that he focuses not on soliciting customers but instead on delivering beer.

Corner of a Café-Concert was first shown in Manet's solo show of 1880 at La Vie Moderne gallery. It was exhibited again in Lyons in 1883 and in 1884 at the École des Beaux-Arts in a posthumous show. Little period commentary on Corner of a Café-Concert exists, likely because it was never exhibited at a Salon or gained widespread notoriety. The general consensus of the commentary that does exist is that the painting is "well observed and rigorously rendered," but it was still poorly received by critics because of the perceived indecency of the waitress who was taken from the "dubious milieux of bohemia." The profession of the waitress is ambiguous because Manet chose to depict a moment in which the waitress is between social transactions and not directly interacting with any customers. This intentional ambiguity can be interpreted as Manet engaging with the changing social conditions of his time.

== See also ==
- List of paintings by Édouard Manet
