= Rue des Martyrs =

Street in Paris

Rue des Martyrs, looking northwards towards the Sacré-Cœur

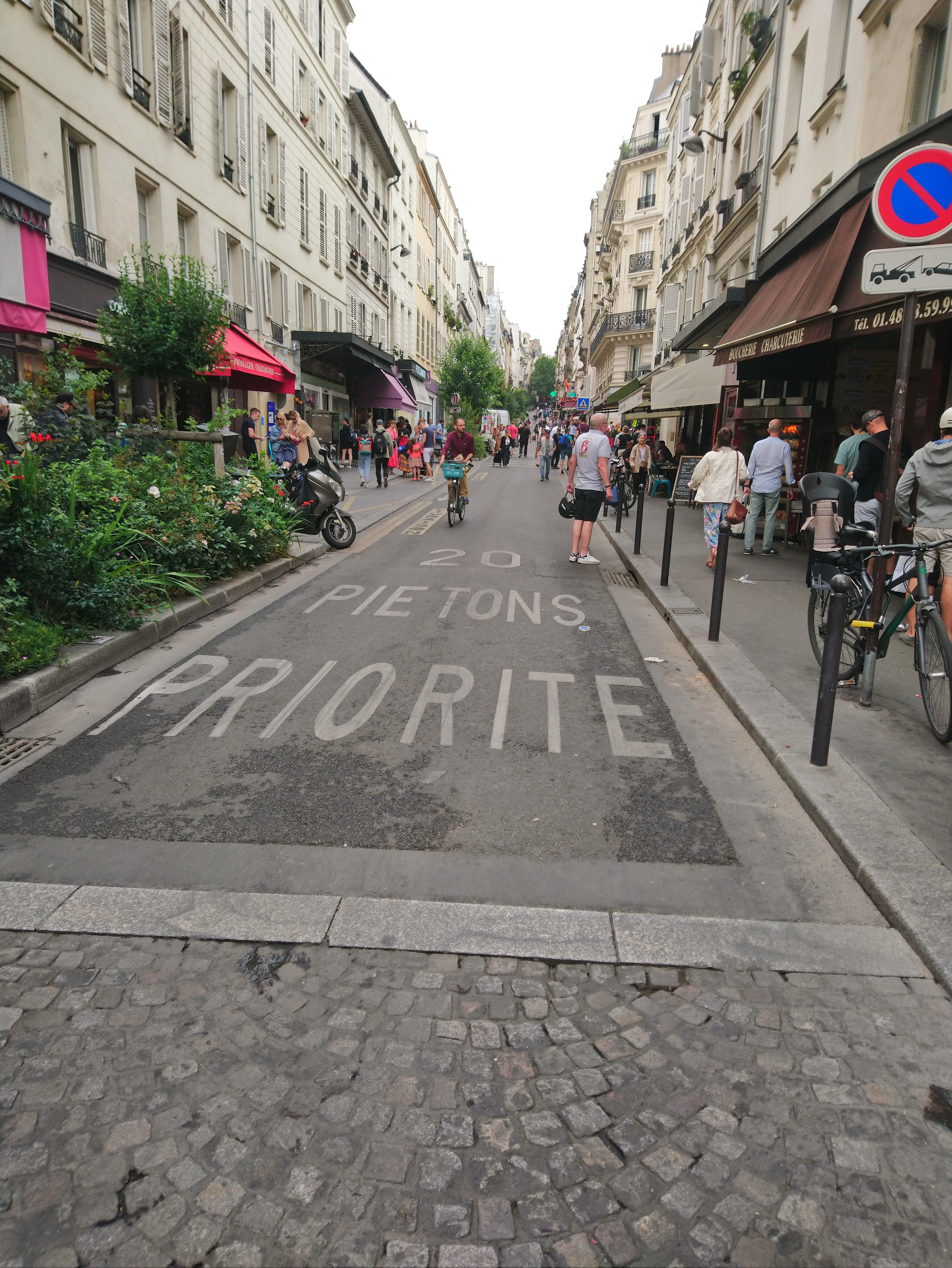
Above: the street in 2022, now with weekend restrictions on cars

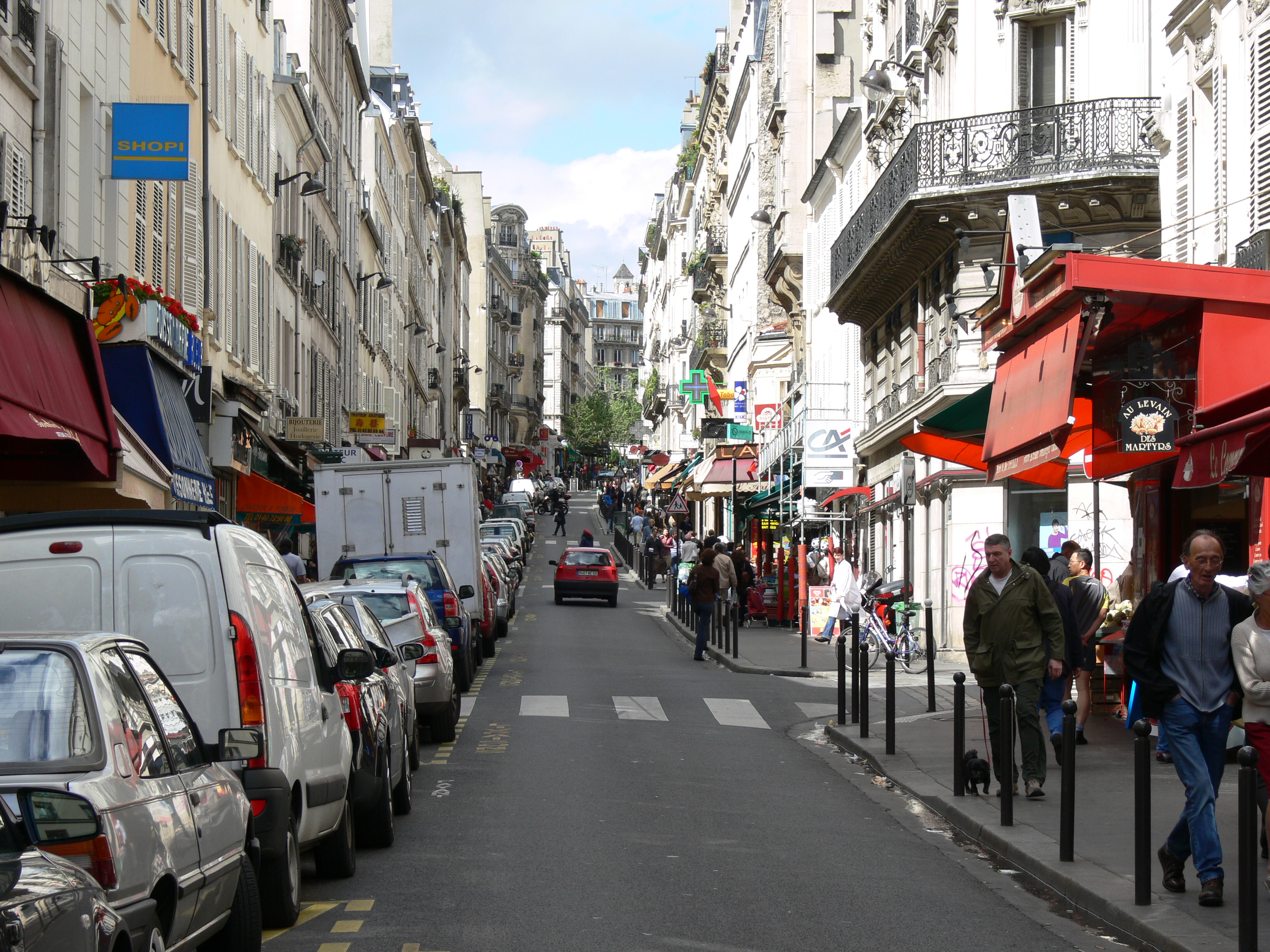
Above: the street in 2006, before weekend restrictions on cars (and before the start of the greening of Paris)

The Rue des Martyrs is a street that passes through the 9th and 18th arrondissements of Paris, France.

The street is an old historic route in Pigalle leading up to the village of Montmartre, linking the church of Notre-Dame-de-Lorette with the Sacré-Cœur. It is lined with around 200 shops and restaurants.

The name derives from the first bishop of Paris and patron saint of Paris, Saint Denis, who was decapitated during the time of the Roman Empire in the 3rd century. He and his companions travelled on this road and died close to where the Basilica of Saint-Denis was founded subsequently.

Rue des Martyrs is busy street in Paris, although the area has undergone gentrification.

The Cirque Medrano (originally called the Cirque Fernando) was a circus located at 63 Boulevard de Rochechouart, at the corner with Rue des Martyrs in the 18th arrondissement at the edge of Montmartre.
