= Château de Montpipeau =

Château in Huisseau-sur-Mauves, France

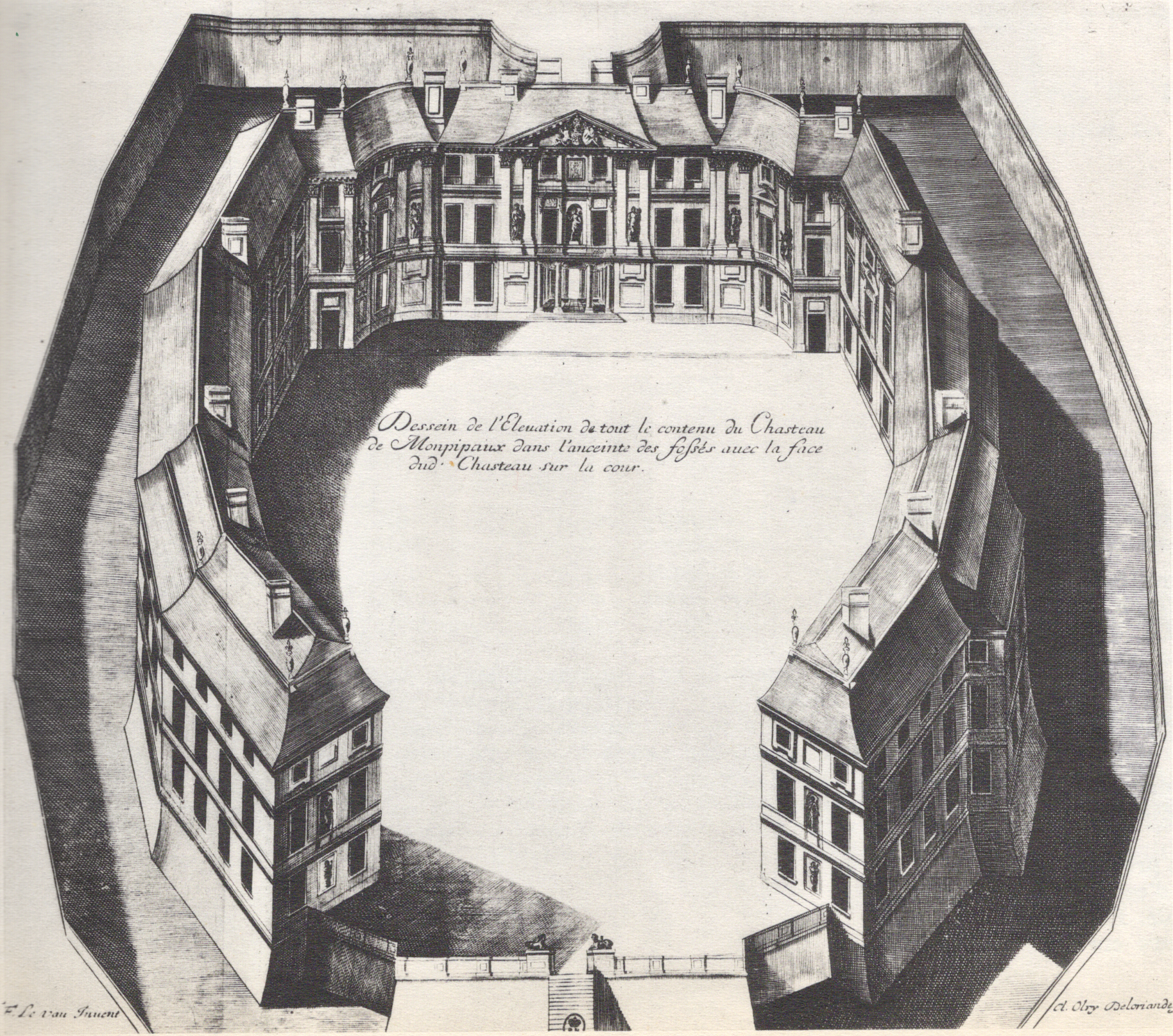
- Bird's-eye view of the entrance front, project (c. 1660) by François Le Vau, engraved by Claude Olry de Loriande

- Location within France

General information
- Architectural style: Medieval, French Baroque
- Location: Huisseau-sur-Mauves, France
- Coordinates: 47.91874°N 1.69493°E

Design and construction
- Architect: François Le Vau (c. 1660)

The Château de Montpipeau was a French château located in what is now the commune of Huisseau-sur-Mauves in the département of Loiret. It is not known when it was constructed, but it is first mentioned in the 12th-century. A new design was made for Louis de Rochechouart by the French architect François Le Vau around 1660, but it is not known whether his design was implemented. The château and its land was originally a seigneurie but was elevated to a marquisat in 1766, four years after it was purchased by François Pierre du Cluzel. The château was mostly destroyed during the French Revolution.

== Sources ==
- Berger, Robert W. (1993). The Palace of the Sun: The Louvre of Louis XIV. University Park: The Pennsylvania State University Press. ISBN 9780271008479.
- Feldmann, Dietrich (1996). "Le Vau", vol. 19, pp. 262–268, in The Dictionary of Art, 34 volumes, edited by Jane Turner. New York: Grove. ISBN 9781884446009. Online reprint, Oxford Art Online (subscription, Wikipedia Library access or UK public library membership required).
- Huisseau (no date). Et si Huisseau m’était conté... [And if Huisseau were to tell its story...], Huisseau sur Mauves, site officiel de la commune.
- Laprade, Albert (1960). François d'Orbay: Architecte de Louis XIV. Paris: Éditions Vincent, Fréal. OCLC 562063179, 780531730, 1096782.
- Ratouis de Limay, Francis; Cuénin, Micheline (2002). Les Ponts et Chaussées au XVIII^{e} siècle : La carrière de Jean Cadet de Limay (Paris 1732 - Orléans 1802). Académie d'Orléans. Copy at Gallica.
