= Miss La La at the Cirque Fernando =

1879 painting by Edgar Degas

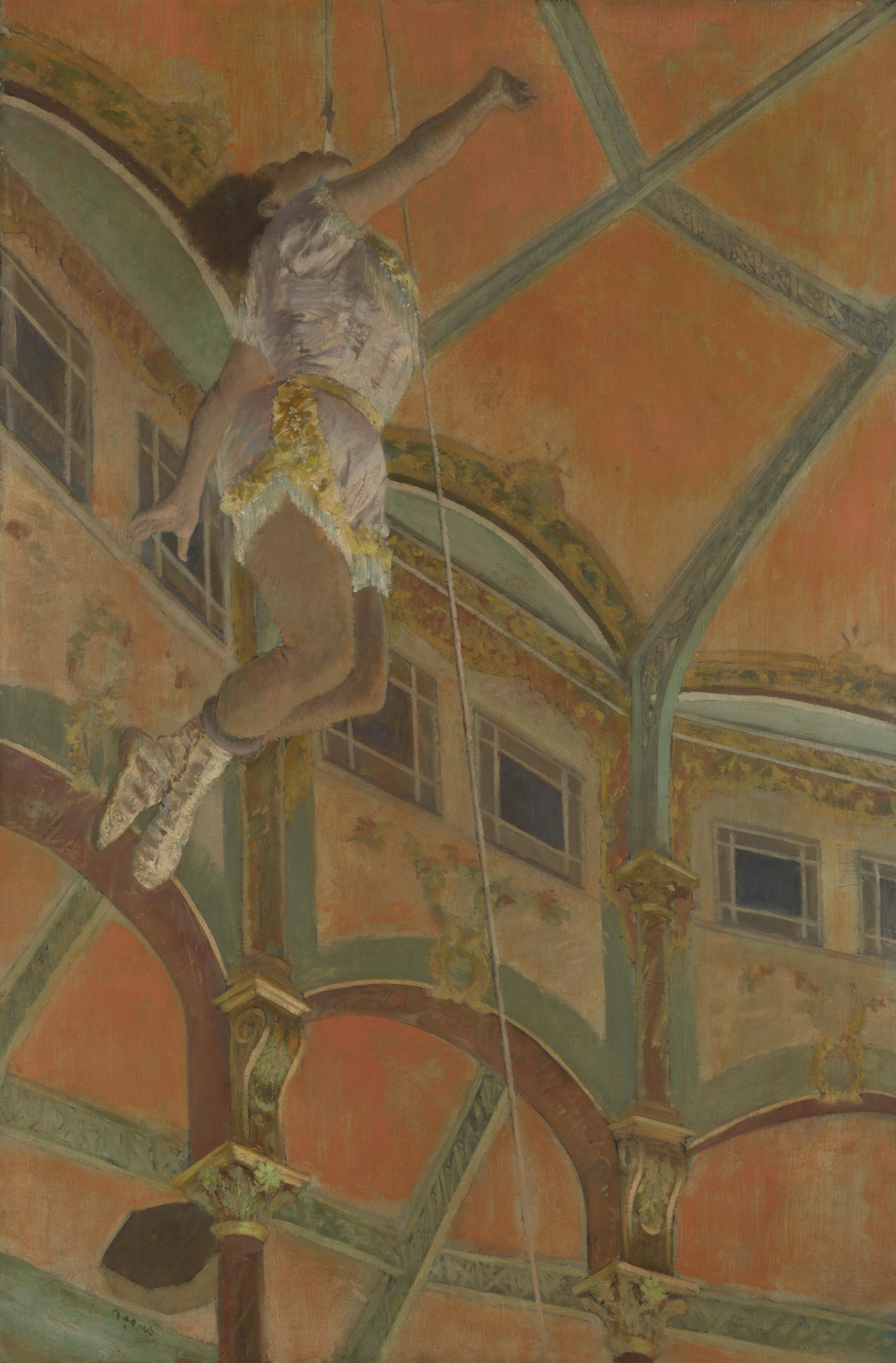
- Artist: Edgar Degas
- Year: 1879
- Medium: Oil on canvas
- Dimensions: 117.2 cm × 77.5 cm (46.1 in × 30.5 in)
- Location: National Gallery, London

Miss La La at the Cirque Fernando is an oil on canvas painting by the French Impressionist artist Edgar Degas. Painted in 1879 and exhibited at the Fourth Impressionist Exhibition in Paris that same year, it is now in the collection of the National Gallery in London. It is Degas's only circus painting, and Miss La La is the only identifiable person of color in Degas's works. The special identity of Miss La La and the great skills Degas used in painting her performance in the circus made this piece of art important, widely appreciated but, at the same time, controversial.

== Introduction ==
Degas visited the recently established Cirque Fernando (built 1875) at least four times between the 19th and 25th of January 1879. The star attraction was the act of Miss La La, a mixed-race acrobat, known as la femme canon. The nickname came from her most sensational trick: to fire a cannon suspended on chains that she held in her teeth while hanging from the trapeze, hooked at the knees.

Degas made numerous sketches in his notebook during his visits and at least four pastel studies afterward. Through these studies, he carefully designed the poses, composition, and color palette of his final painting.

== Content ==
The painting shows Miss La La suspended from the rafters of the circus dome by a rope clenched between her teeth. The sense of suspended animation in the scene is consistent with Degas's larger interest in capturing fleeting moments.

This work is Degas's only circus painting. Unlike his contemporaries like Henri de Toulouse-Lautrec and Georges Seurat, the focus is not on the action within the ring or the crowd's reactions; the viewer sees the spectacle as the audience would have done, gazing up at the daring feat taking place above.

The pose of Miss La La was carefully studied and designed by Degas. In his earlier studies, he experimented with the frontal view of Miss La La instead of the profile view. In the sketches, Miss La La's head turns backward, hiding her face from the audience, which is similar to her pose on posters advertising her performance. However, Degas later changed to the profile view, introducing more curves and arches as well as more movement. Some scholars have connected this pose to contemporary ethnographic photography, suggesting that the profile view turns the woman into "a representation of the race." By painting her in the profile view, Degas is not portraying her as merely a performer, but a representative for the women of color and the working class.

Degas may have also been seeking to emulate the expansive ceiling paintings by Italian artists such as Giovanni Battista Tiepolo, which he may have seen on his trips to Italy, in painting a highly foreshortened figure.

== Composition ==
As an impressionist, Degas showed great interest in capturing fleeting moments and used his unique composition to achieve it. In many of his ballet paintings, the figures are not in the center of the canvas. Instead, they are arranged at the sides or the corners, leaving the center empty. While some scholars have suggested that he learned this method from photography, others have pointed out that photographic exposure times were not yet short enough to capture such fleeting effects, and no photographs with similar compositions have been found from the period.

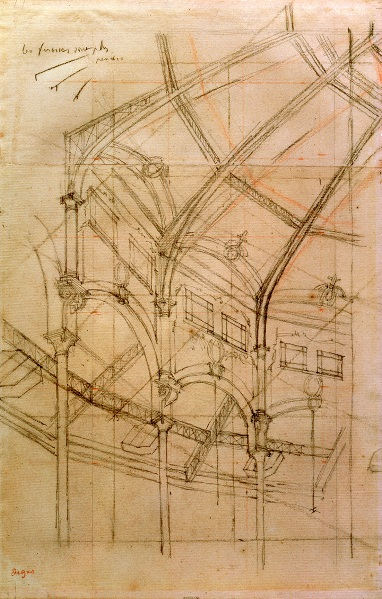
Study of the ceiling

Degas carefully planned the spatial relations between Miss La La and the architecture. She is hanging in the air, but the intersecting lines in the background form a web that helps secure her position in the composition. There are many vertical and diagonal lines in the composition, but no horizontals, creating a sense of movement and tension. The point of view from below has been interpreted as a reversal of the publicly expected hierarchical relationship between the largely white audience and the mixed-race performer.

== Use of color ==
Degas mainly used unsaturated orange and green with different shades of gray, which is consistent with the palette found in many of his other paintings of women. Miss La La's arms and legs are not purely brown but are a mixture of orange and green. He learned “the use of green as a second flesh tone” from the 14th-century Italian artist Cennino Cennini, who developed it and taught it to his pupils.

In this final painting, Degas intentionally lightened the skin color of Miss La La and painted her costume with yellow and violet to blur her mixed-race identity. He had experimented with different colors in his earlier studies. For example, a pastel sketch Degas made on January 21, 1879 (the second sketch shown below) showed that Miss La La has a much darker skin color and was dressed in blue. The skin color became lighter in his later sketch on January 24, 1879 (the third sketch shown below).

The painting's background, the ceiling of the circus, is painted mainly in reddish orange and bluish green. Degas painted the wall in layers, mixing the cold green color with the warm orange color until it achieved a pleasant harmony. Each section of colors is distinct; a hint of green can be seen through the orange area and vice versa. This set of complementary colors harmonized with the colors used to represent Miss La La, integrating her into the background.

== Sketches of Miss La La ==
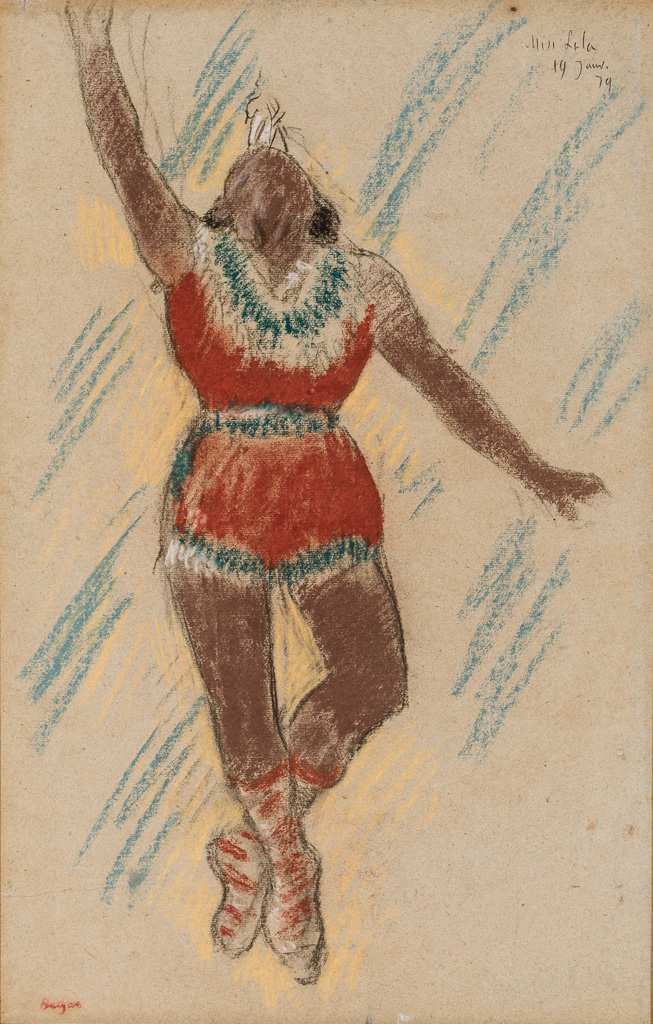
Edgar Degas, Study for Miss Lala at the Cirque Fernando, 1879. Pastel on laid paper, 48.6 cm × 31.8 cm (19.2 in × 12.5 in). Collection of the Speed Art Museum, Louisville, bequest of Mrs. Blackmore Wheeler.

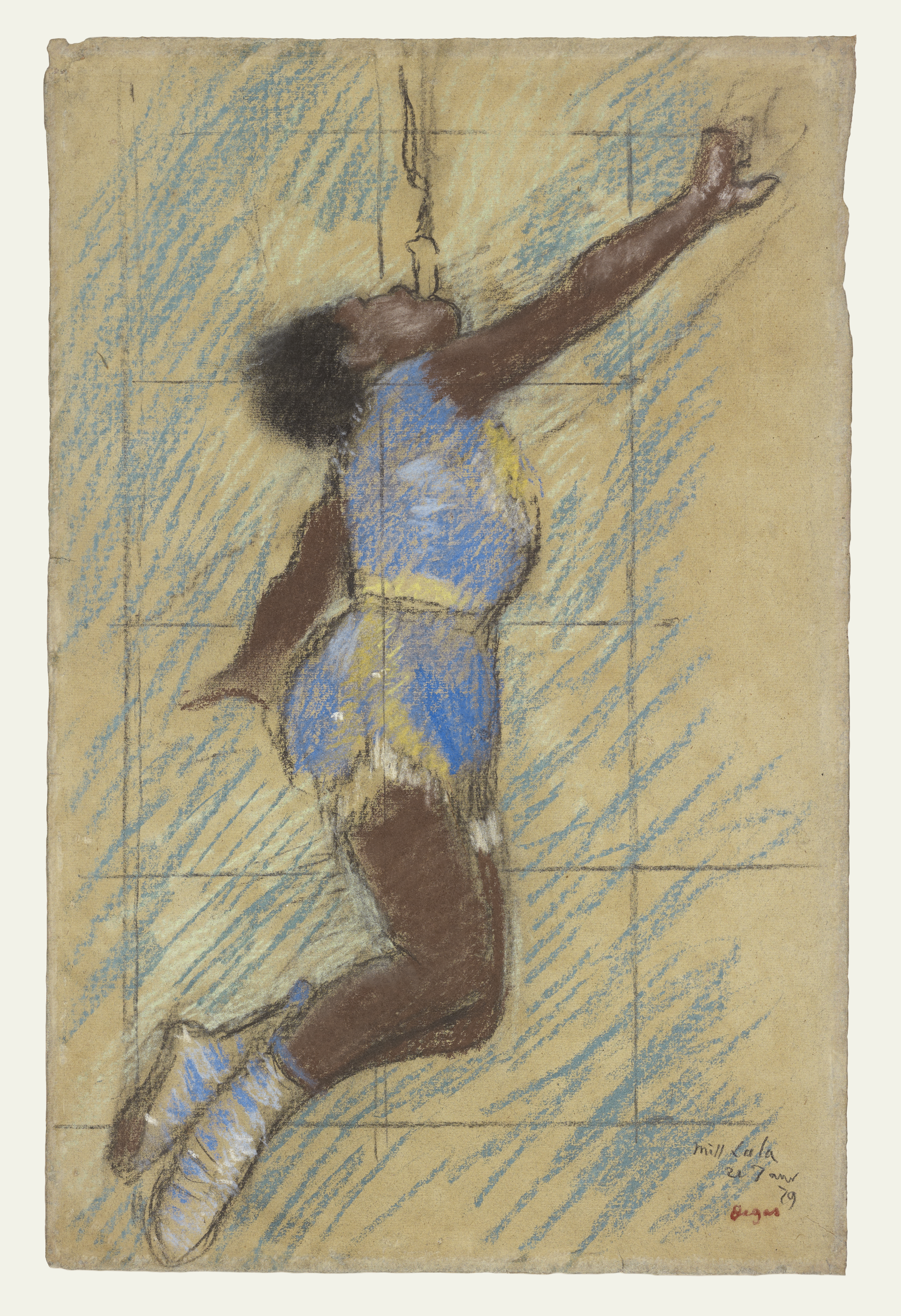
Edgar Degas, Miss Lala at the Fernando Circus, 1879. Pastel on paper, 46.4 cm × 29.8 cm (18.25 in × 11.75 in). J. Paul Getty Museum, Los Angeles.

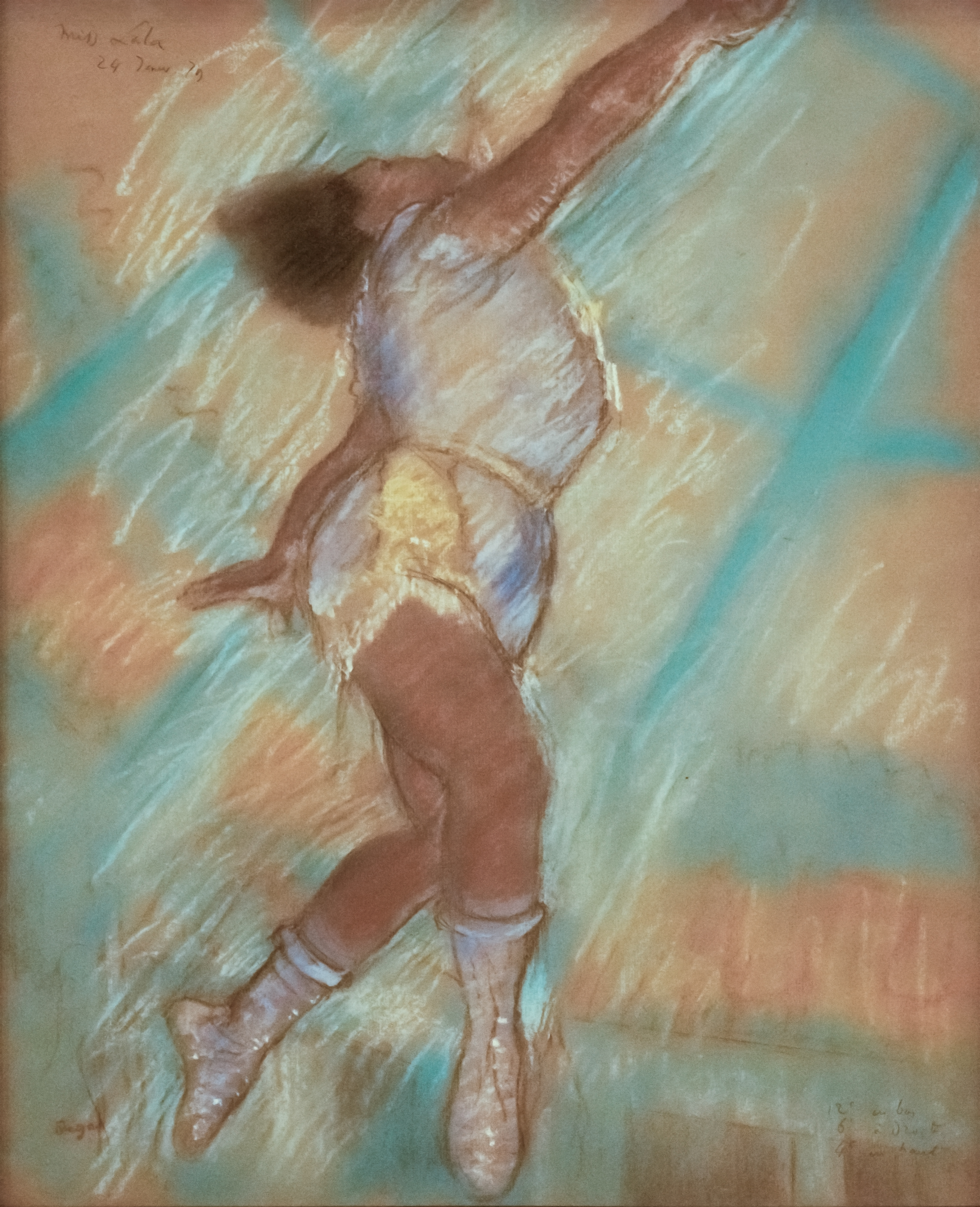
Edgar Degas, Miss Lala at the Fernando Circus, 1879. Pastel on paper, 61 cm × 47.5 cm (24 in × 18.75 in). Tate, London.

== Critics and debates ==
Commentators have differed in interpreting the role of race in the painting. On the one hand, Degas does not give Miss La La stereotypical features, and some critics have suggested that he wished to challenge the traditional view of black women. On the other hand, he intentionally lightened the skin color of Miss La La and hid her face, partially obscuring her identity. Art historian Marilyn R. Brown argued that these changes could be a reflection of Degas's anxiety about his own racial identity.

There is also a debate about whether Miss La La at the Cirque Fernando is a portrait of Miss La La or a genre painting of the circus. Miss La La is the only figure shown in this painting. Degas did not include any audience or other acrobats, focusing attention on Miss La La and making the painting function as a portrait. However, Degas did not show her face to the audience, making the scene more like a genre painting, in which the identity of the subject cannot be firmly established.

== Legacy ==
The painting was bought by the trustees of the Courtauld Fund in 1925. Originally displayed in the Tate, it was transferred to the National Gallery in the 1950s, along with masterpieces by Manet, Renoir, Seurat and Van Gogh, once they were no longer regarded as modern. The National Gallery held an exhibition in 2024 titled Discover Degas & Miss La La, which included earlier drawings by Degas, together with photographs and posters telling the story of Miss La La.
