= Cirque Medrano =

Former circus building in Paris, France

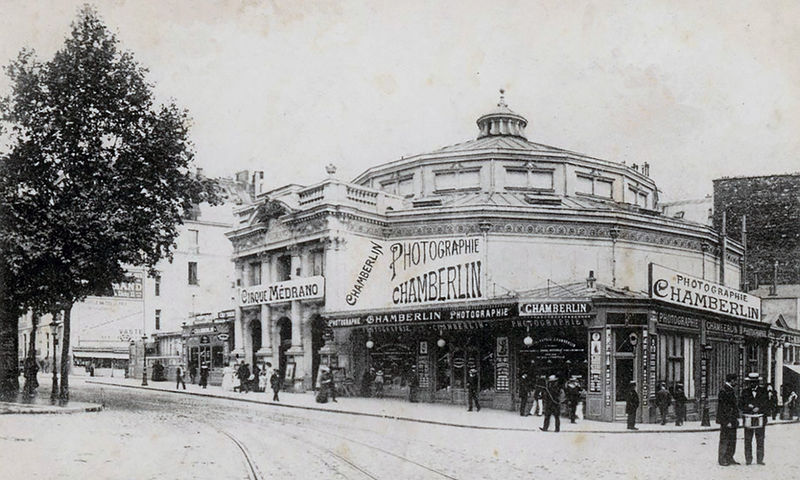
The Cirque Medrano, Boulevard de Rochechouart (c.1898)

The Cirque Medrano (in English: Circus Medrano) is a French circus that was located at 63 Boulevard de Rochechouart, at the corner of rue des Martyrs, in the 18th arrondissement at the edge of Montmartre in Paris. It was originally called Cirque Fernando. The title "Cirque Medrano" is still active today: it is now a successful French traveling circus.

== History ==
The Parisian circus was created by a Belgian circus entrepreneur, Ferdinand Beert (1835–1902), known as Fernando, and was built at the corner of the Boulevard de Rochechouart and the Rue des Martyrs, in what was then the edge of the City of Paris, under the name "Cirque Fernando." The area was a working-class neighborhood at the foot of the hill of Montmartre, famous for its many places of popular entertainment, among which the Moulin de la Galette and the famous Bal du Moulin Rouge — and in the vicinity of the Bateau-Lavoir in Montmartre, where many young painters lived.

=== Cirque Fernando ===
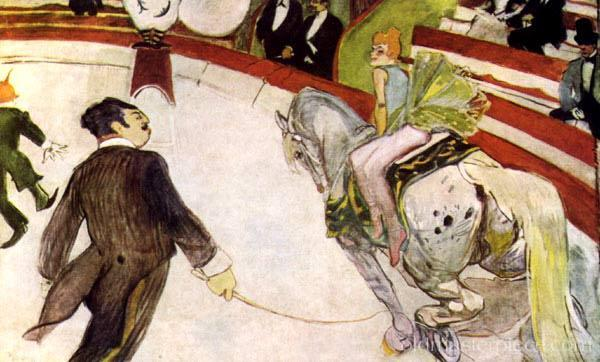
Toulouse-Lautrec's oil on canvas painting, Ecuyère au Cirque Fernando, 1887–1888, shows Louis Fernando leading the horse of an equestrienne.

An acrobat and equestrian, Fernando started his Cirque Fernando in Vierzon, France, in 1872. The following year, he came to Paris to perform at the Fête de Montmartre, but the traditional fairgrounds for this annual fair were on the very spot on which the Church of the Sacré-Cœur was being built. Fernando thus went on to search for a suitable empty lot nearby, and found it on the Boulevard de Rochechouart, between the rue des Martyrs and the present rue Viollet-le-Duc. He had considerable success there, which went far beyond the context of the fair. He therefore managed to obtain a thirty-year lease on his piece of land to build a permanent circus. Designed by the architect Gustave Gridaine, the new Cirque Fernando opened on June 25, 1875.

Because of its proximity to Montmartre, the circus attracted many artists (Renoir, Degas, Lautrec, among many others), who came to sketch the performers in action, which sometimes resulted in full paintings. They brought in their wake members of the Parisian "bohème", writers, journalists, actors, who generated publicity for the circus. Mrs. Fernando, who oversaw the box office, decided to let the painters work freely in the circus during rehearsals and watch the performances free of charge — a tradition that will remain under the subsequent management of Gerónimo Medrano.

Fernando Beert eventually gave the management of his circus to his stepson, Louis, known as Louis Fernando (1851-?). Although Louis's artistic direction proved quite successful, notably with popular revues written for his star clown, Gerónimo Medrano (1849-1912), known as "Boum-Boum," his financial management of the family's enterprise was often erratic. He eventually led the circus to bankruptcy in October 1897. In the following December, Gerónimo Medrano bought back Fernando's lease, and renamed the circus Cirque Medrano.

=== Cirque Medrano ===
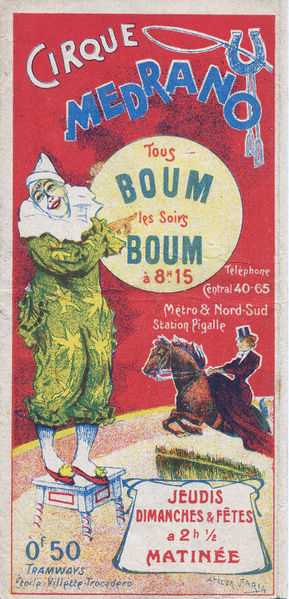
Cirque Medrano's program cover by Cândido de Faria (c. 1900)

Gerónimo Medrano successfully revived the circus of the Boulevard de Rochechouart. It remained a meeting point for artists: Picasso, Braque, Kees van Dongen were regulars. Medrano managed the circus until his death in 1912. Then, his wife, Berthe (née Perrin,1876-1920), took over the circus, and gave the artistic management to Rodolphe Bonten, a former acrobat. Gerónimo and Berthe had a son, Jérôme Medrano (1907-1998), who was five years old when his father died. To ensure her son's future, Berthe, whose health was deteriorating, remarried with Rodolphe Bonten. Jérôme was given a formal education in elite schools that had not much to do with the circus.

During World War I, Bonten hired a trio of clowns, the Fratellinis, who soon became the Idols of Paris and ensured Medrano's financial success. When Berthe Medrano died of cancer in 1920, Rodolphe Bonten took over the full management of the circus, but the lease actually reverted to Jérôme Medrano, who was only thirteen. Bonten's management was sound, if not overly imaginative (he let the Fratellinis go to his main competition, Paris's Cirque d'Hiver, in 1924), and Cirque Medrano continued to thrive. It was still a favorite rendez-vous for the Parisian artistic elite — and still attracted many artists, who were always welcome around the ring.

During World War II and the German Occupation of France, the lease of the Cirque Medrano, which, since Fernando's bankruptcy, included the land as well as the walls, was put for sale. Jérôme Medrano had joined the French Resistance, and was not in a position to buy his circus back; the wealthy Bouglione family, owners of Paris's Cirque d'Hiver, bought the land and the walls from their rightful owners, the Saint family, paying them in gold. At the end of the War, Jérôme Medrano found himself being the tenant of his main competitors.

From one lawsuit to another, Jérôme Medrano managed to stay at the helm of his circus until the end of 1962, when the Bougliones finally took possession of the building. During that time, the show often had guest stars as Buster Keaton, Grock, Achille Zavatta, Charlie Rivel, the famous French comedian Fernand Raynaud, and even the tap-dancer Harold Nicholas. The Cirque Medrano gave its last performance on January 7, 1963, in front of a house packed with the Tout-Paris and a crowd of disconsolate Parisians, habitués, circus fans, and friends from the neighborhood.

The Bougliones revived the circus for a couple of seasons under the name Cirque de Montmartre, but the magic was gone. Although their shows were commendable, they were mostly a replica of what could be seen at the Cirque d'Hiver. They rented the building for a short while to Ariane Mnouchkine's Théâtre du Soleil, and then to a Fête de la Bière—a sort of Bavarian beer-hall. The building slowly went into a state of disrepair. The Bougliones demolished it in December 1974. An apartment building called The Bouglione now occupies the site.

== Cirque Medrano in the arts ==
Edgar Degas, the French Impressionist artist, painted Miss La La at the Cirque Fernando in 1879, now in the National Gallery in London . Auguste Renoir, another Impressionist artist, painted Jugglers at the Cirque Fernando , which is at the Art Institute of Chicago. Georges Seurat's pointillist painting The Circus (1891) also depicts the Cirque Fernando. In the late 19th century, the Parisian Post-Impressionist artist Henri de Toulouse-Lautrec also attended the Cirque Medrano and produced many drawing and pastels depicting its performances . Later, Pablo Picasso made many study-sketches at the Cirque Medrano for his Pink Period series of acrobats. Fernand Léger painted Le Cirque Medrano (1918), which is in the collections of the Musée d'Art Moderne in Paris, and published a full album of drawings and paintings titled Cirque (1950), for which his sketched his subjects at the Cirque Medrano. There are many other painters who used the Cirques Fernando and Medrano, and their performers, as their subjects.

== Today ==
Circus entrepreneur Raoul Gibault leased the Medrano name rights from Jérôme and Violette Medrano and, to this day, his Cirque Medrano-Raoul Gibault has toured France with a big top. His organization has several units that travel under the Medrano title, including Medrano's Cirque sur l'eau (water circus) and Medrano's Cirque de Saint Petersbourg (St. Petersburg Circus).

== In popular culture ==
In Henry Miller's 1934 novel, Tropic of Cancer, Cirque Médrano is mentioned as one of the places that he would visit with his expat friend, Carl. Medrano has also appeared in several French popular novels, in songs, and in films (notably during the German Occupation period).
