= Cavallo =

Cavallo may refer to:

== People ==
- Daniela Cavallo (born 1975), German business executive
- Diana Cavallo (1931–2017), American writer
- Domingo Cavallo (born 1946), Argentine economist and politician
- Émile-Gustave Cavallo-Péduzzi (1851–1917), French painter
- Jimmy Cavallo (1927–2019), American musician
- Josh Cavallo (born 1999), Australian association football player
- Mimmo Cavallo (born 1951), Italian musician
- Ricardo Cavallo (born 1951), Argentine political activist
- Rob Cavallo (born 1963), American music producer
- Tiberius Cavallo (1749–1809), Anglo-Italian physicist
- Victor Cavallo (1947–2000), Italian actor

== Other ==
- Cavallo (coin), an Italian Renaissance coin
- Cavallo (island), an island near Corsica
- Cavallo, Ohio, a community in the United States
- Cavallo di ritorno
- Monte Cavallo

== See also ==
- Cavalli
- Leoncavallo
