= Léo Gausson =

French painter

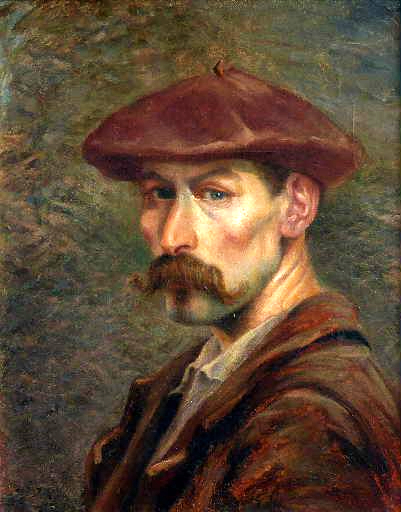
An early self-portrait

Léo Gausson (14 February 1860 – 27 October 1944) was a French landscape painter in the Neo-impressionist and Synthetic styles. He was also a printmaker and sculptor.

== Biography ==
He was born in Lagny-sur-Marne. He began his art education by taking evening classes, mostly devoted to sculpture, at the "National School of Decorative Arts". When he first turned to painting, he found his inspiration in the Barbizon School, to which he was introduced by Antonio Cortés, a local artist, originally from Spain, who had studied with Constant Troyon. Later, he became acquainted with the xylographers Maximilien Luce and Émile-Gustave Cavallo-Péduzzi, after which he produced posters from lithographs and woodcuts.

In 1885, he considered his artistic development to be complete, as reflected in a lengthy letter to Émile Zola, with whom he had long corresponded. He also made an extended stay in Brittany. In June 1890, Gausson was mentioned in a letter from Theo van Gogh to his brother Vincent in connection with a proposed exchange of paintings, which was completed after Vincent's death.

During the same period, Gausson was associated with Camille Pissarro and sometimes visited him at Éragny-sur-Epte. In a letter dated 10 July 1888, Pissarro encouraged Gausson to visit him and his family there. In 1891, Gausson painted Jardin de Camille Pissarro et le clocher d'Éragny (Camille Pissarro's Garden and the Church Tower of Éragny), a Pointillist view of Pissarro's garden.

Ever desiring something new, Gausson slowly turned to Synthetism and, from 1889 to 1894, simplified his paintings and brightened his colors. During that period, he participated in avant-garde exhibitions; notably with "Les XX" in Brussels, the association "Pour l'art" in Antwerp and in Paris at Le Barc de Boutteville and the "Salon des Cent". Some of his poster designs were reproduced in the magazine Les Maîtres de l'Affiche.

He also had a connection with the Symbolist movement; corresponding with several noted writers. Later, he would provide illustrations for works by the poet, Adolphe Retté, and Gustave Kahn provided commentary for the catalog of Gausson's 1896 exhibition at the Galerie Laffitte. Gausson himself wrote a book of short stories, Histoires vertigineuses (Giddy Stories), but it was not very successful. In 1900, he was named an officer of the Académie des Beaux-Arts for his work on a monument to the builder, Charles Colinet at Fontainebleau.

Despite his successes, he continued to have financial difficulties. In an effort to alleviate them, he took a position with the French Colonial Administration and was posted to Guinea in 1901, where he spent eight years.

Upon returning to France, he settled in Paris. Having no children, he often visited his nephew, who had a small shop in Lagny-sur-Marne. He was there when the German Army occupied Paris in 1940, and remained until his death.

== Selected paintings ==
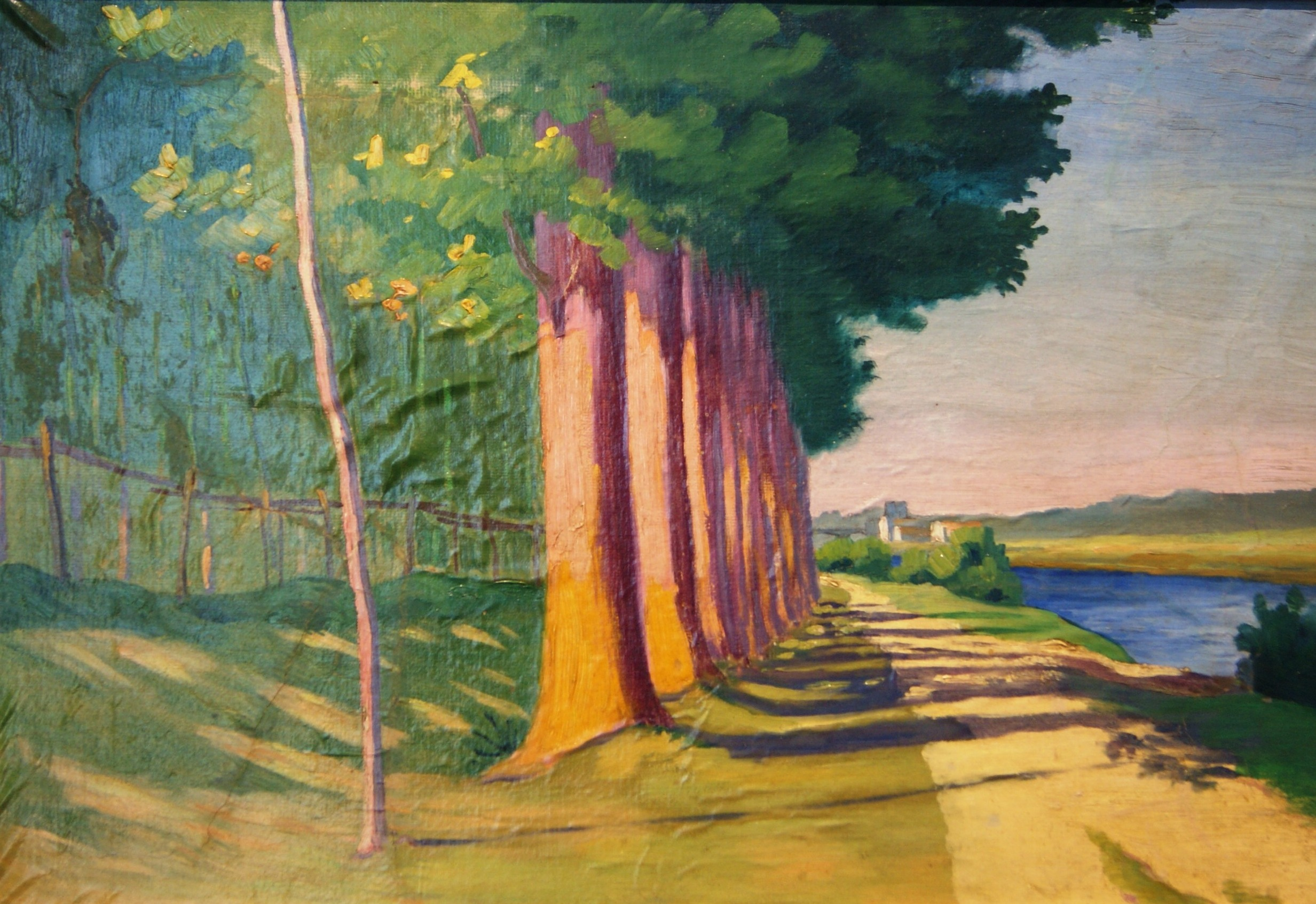
Trees on the Banks of the Quai de la Gourdine

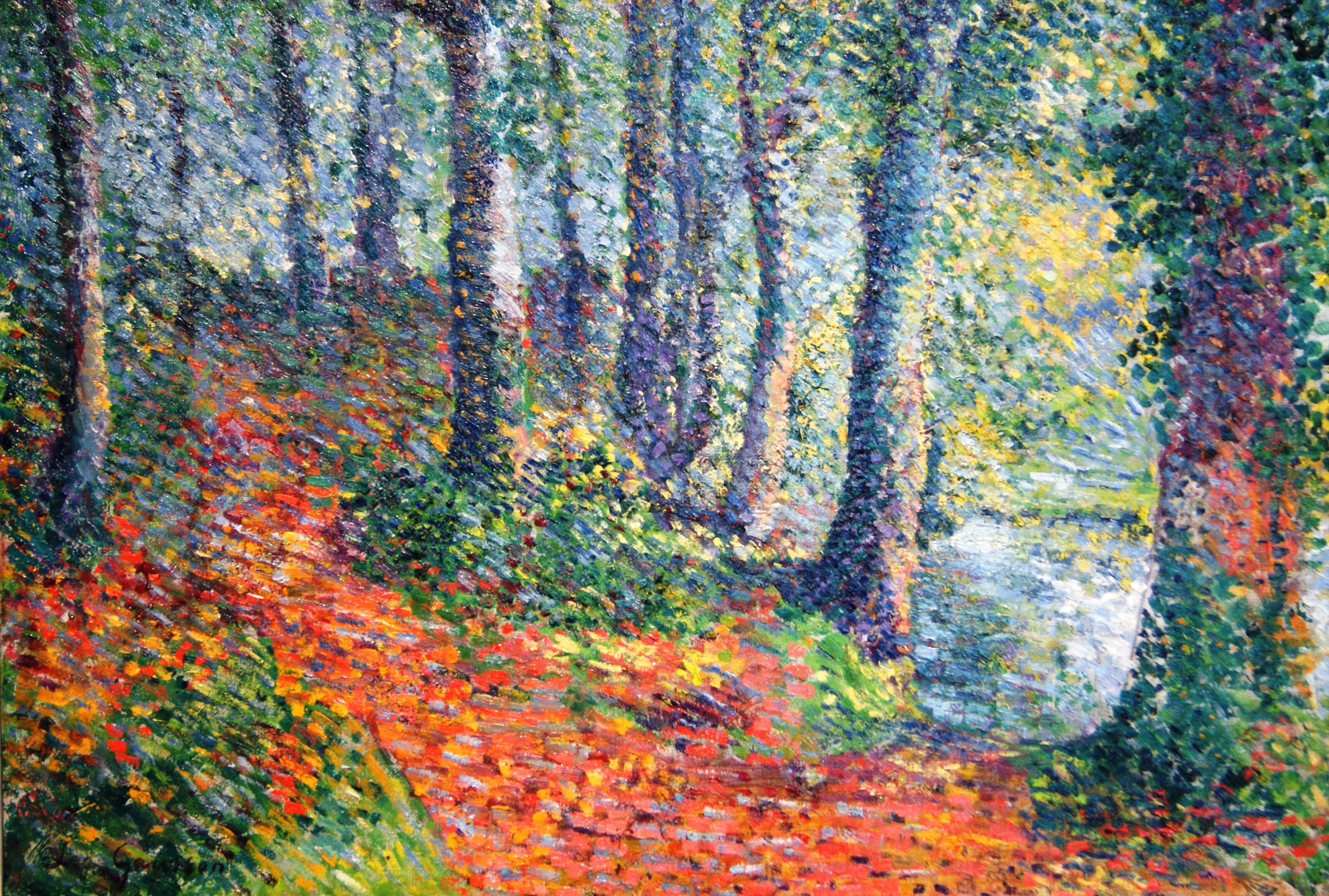
Undergrowth

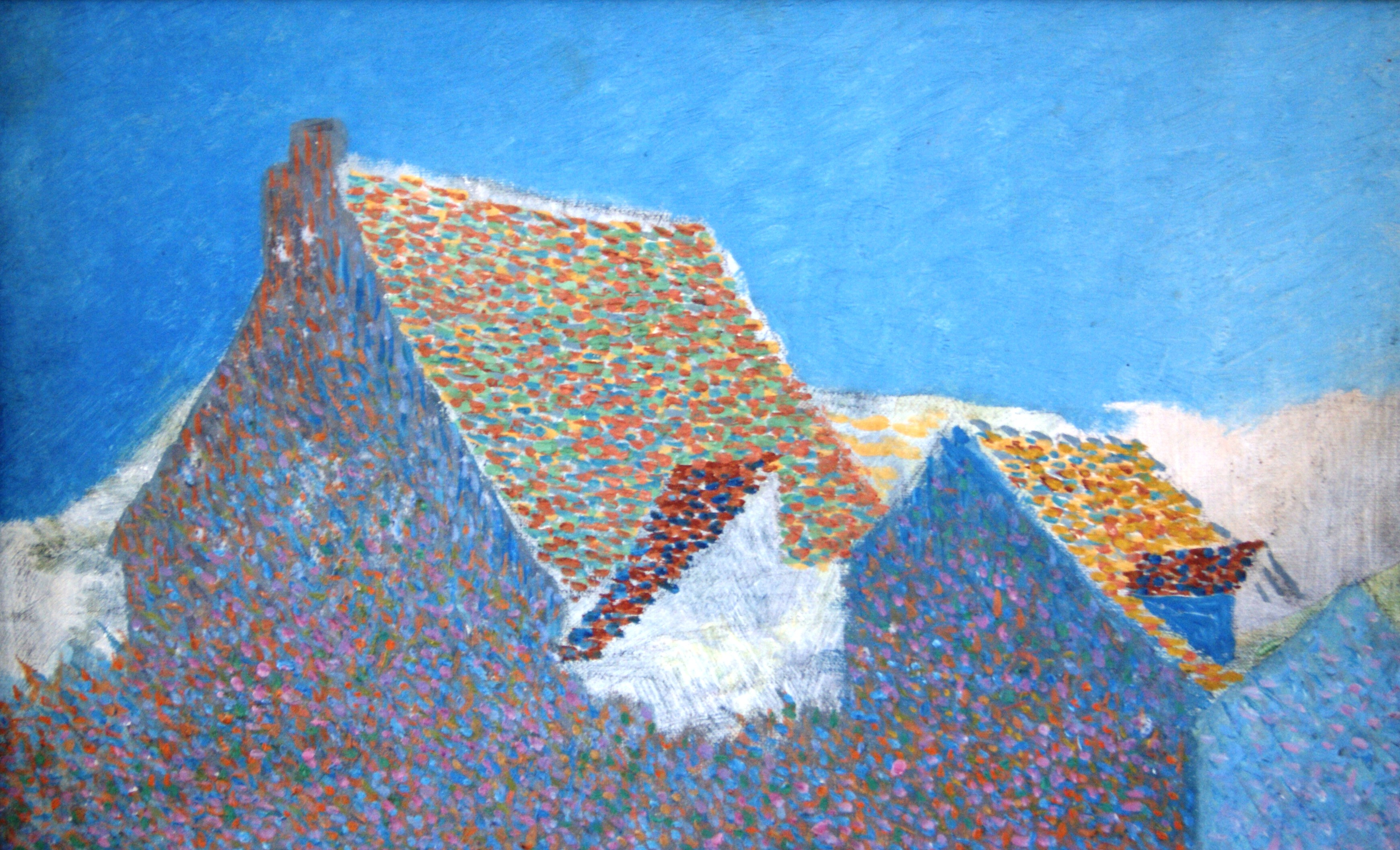
The Roofs

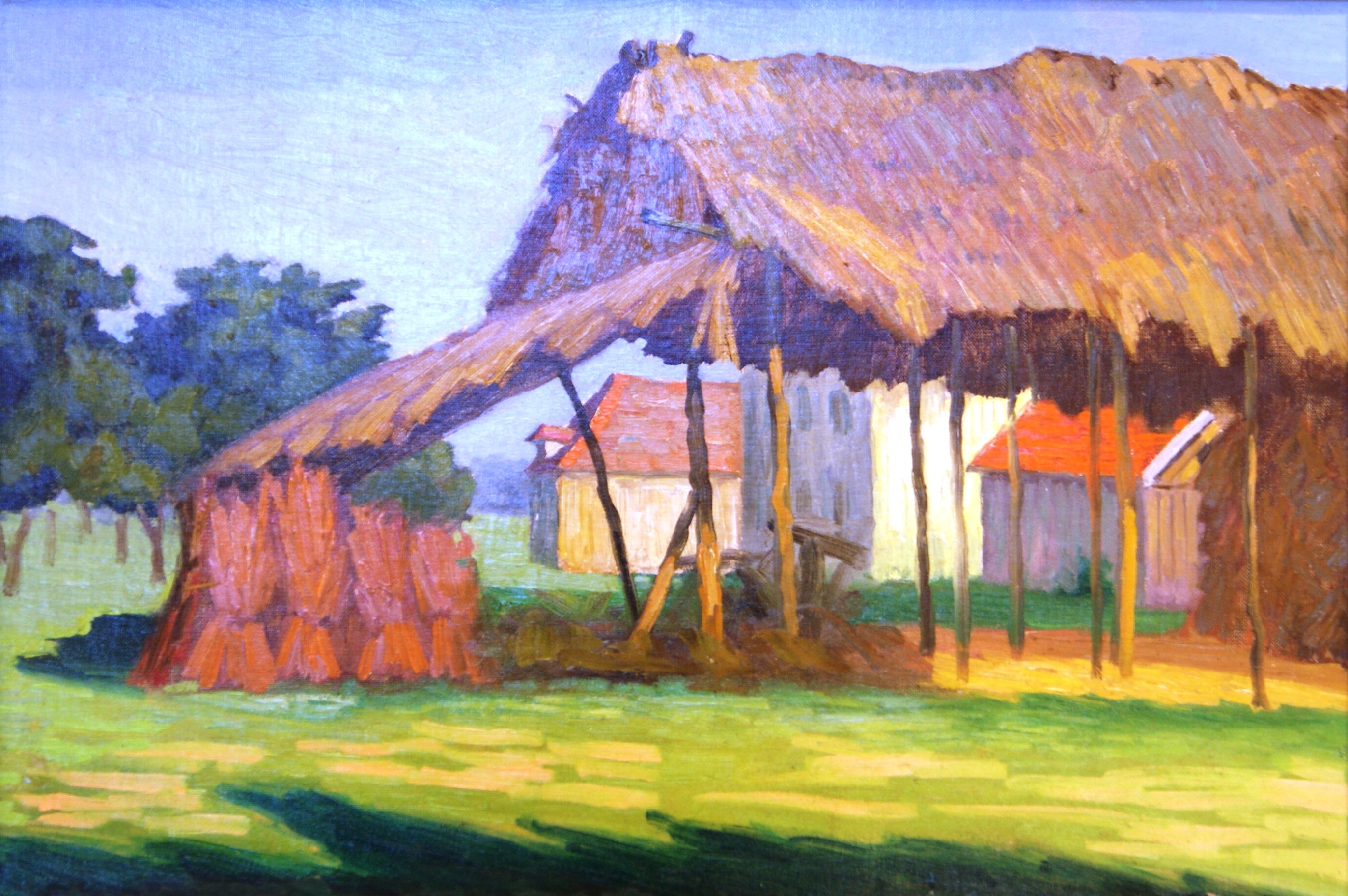
Hangar with a Thatched Roof

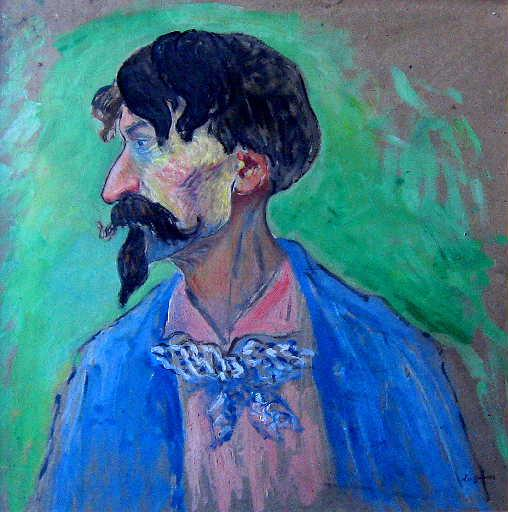
A later self-portrait
