= Carlo Sciaccaluga =

Italian theatre director, actor, translator (born 1987)

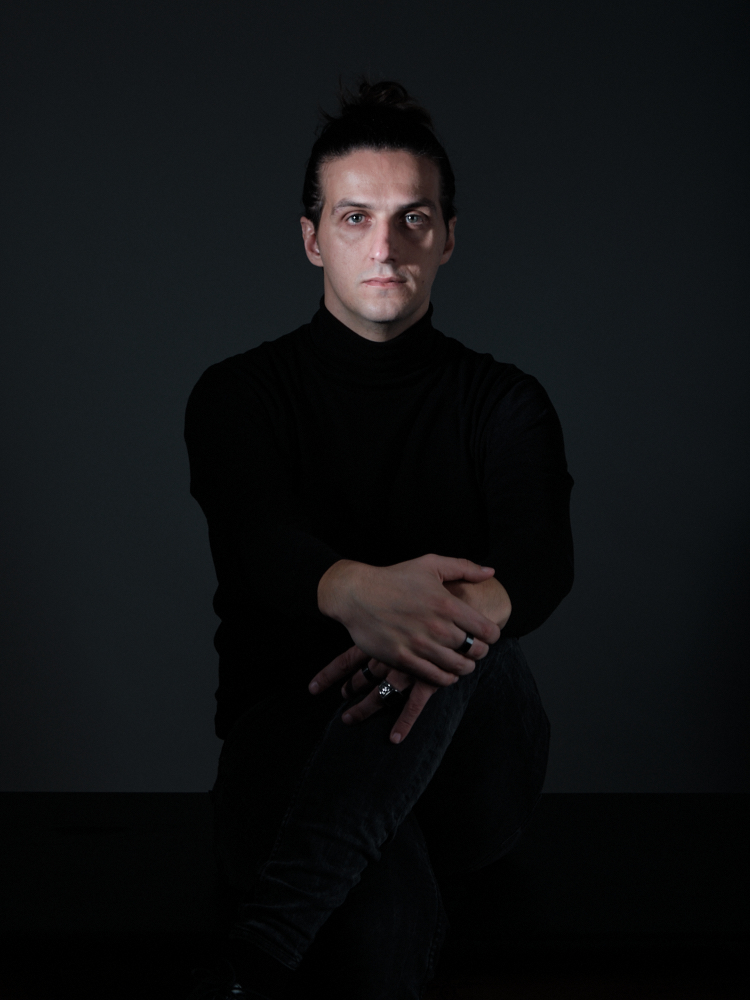
- Born: 4 November 1987 (age 38); Genoa, Italy
- Occupations: theatre director, actor, translator

Carlo Sciaccaluga (born 4 November 1987 in Genoa) is an Italian theatre director, actor and translator. He is the son of artists (his father, Marco Sciaccaluga, was also a director, while his mother, Valeria Manari, was a set designer and costume designer). He made his debut as an actor in 2009, performing in German with Matthias Langhoff at the Landestheater in Linz, Austria. He debuted as a director at a young age, staging an adaptation of Haruki Murakami's After the Quake.

In the 2010–2011 season, he worked as an actor with the Gank company, and in 2011–2012, he acted in The Robbers by Friedrich Schiller, directed by Gabriele Lavia, who directed him in several productions over the following years. In 2013, Sciaccaluga directed the Italian premiere of The Pillowman by Martin McDonagh at the Teatro Stabile di Genova and translated Dealer's Choice by Patrick Marber, which premiered at the Teatro Duse in Genoa, directed by Antonio Zavatteri. In the summer of 2014, he presented his Cyrano de Bergerac at the Borgio Verezzi Festival, and in 2015, he translated and directed Othello, which premiered at the Versiliana Festival, with Filippo Dini and Antonio Zavatteri in the lead roles. During the 2017–2018 and 2018–2019 seasons, he worked as an actor with the Teatro Stabile/Teatro Nazionale of Naples. From 2016 to 2019, he was resident director at the National Experimental Theatre in Tirana, Albania. In 2021, Sciaccaluga translated and directed The Conspiracy of Fiesco in Genoa by Schiller, which was performed in Piazza San Lorenzo, Genoa, in an experimental theatrical setting in the heart of the city.

He has directed productions for numerous private companies, as well as for the Teatro Nazionale di Genova, the Teatro Stabile di Napoli, the Teatro Stabile di Catania, the Turkistan Muzikalik Drama Teatri and the Abay National Theatre of Opera and Ballet of Almaty in Kazakhstan. In March 2025, he directed a revival of Peter Shaffer's Equus for the Teatro Nazionale in Genoa, which met with great critical acclaim and for which Sciaccaluga received a nomination for Best Director at Le Maschere Awards (the Italian equivalent of the Tony Awards). His father Marco had directed the first Italian production of the same play in 1975.

As associate director to Davide Livermore, Sciaccaluga has co-signed two productions of Verdi's Il trovatore, at the Sydney Opera House and Teatro Regio in Parma.

In addition to his directing career, he also works as a translator, both for his own productions and for those of other directors, with a particular focus on contemporary playwright Martin McDonagh and classical author Schiller. In 2024, he signed a new original adaptation of The Turn of the Screw by Henry James, produced by the Teatro Nazionale di Genova and the Teatro Carlo Felice, directed by Davide Livermore.

In 2022, he appeared in Petra, a TV series by Sky starring Paola Cortellesi, in 2023 in Blanca, a TV series starring Maria Chiara Giannetta, aired on Rai 1, and in 2024 in Citadel: Diana on Amazon Prime Video.
