= Pippo Delbono =

Italian director actor and film critic

Pippo Delbono (born 1 June 1959 in Varazze, Italy) is an Italian author, actor, and director.

== Biography ==
Pippo Delbono began training in traditional theatre in Denmark, studying the principles of oriental theatre, through a rigorous work on body and voice. Later, in Germany, Delbono was invited by Pina Bausch to follow her work. At the beginning of the 80's he founded the Compagnia Pippo Delbono, creating most of his works with them, from Il Tempo degli Assassini (1987) to La Gioia (2018).

He does not stage plays but, rather, total creations, devised with a stable group of actors whose number has grown through the years. The encounter with socially marginalized people determines a turning point in his poetical research: that's how Barboni (1997) was born. Some of these actors – among them Bobò, deaf-mute, who had been kept in an asylum in Aversa, near Naples, for forty-five years and recently died – have kept working with the company and are still a central part of this experience.

The works that followed — La rabbia dedicated to Pasolini, Guerra, Esodo, Gente di plastica, Racconti di giugno, Urlo, Il silenzio, Questo buio feroce, La menzogna, Dopo la battaglia, Orchidee, Vangelo, La gioia — like the ones before, have been performed worldwide in more than fifty countries, in theaters and festivals, including the Festival d'Avignon (where a lot of the company's creations were presented), Barcelona's Grec, Theater Spektakel in Zurich, Festwochen in Wien, Festival TransAmeriques in Montreal, Venice Biennale, etc.

In 2009, he was awarded the Europe Prize Theatrical Realities, in Wrocław.

Several theatres, including the Théâtre du Rond-Point in Paris, Piccolo Teatro in Milan, Teatro Argentina in Rome, among others, present regularly his performances. Henry V — his only creation based on an existing play – is the only Italian production of Shakespeare that has ever been invited to perform at the Royal Shakespeare Company. His production Vangelo (2016) has been realized at Croatian National Theatre in Zagreb with actors of his company together with Croatian actors, dancers, musicians and chorus and with refugees of the PIAM refugee camp in Asti (Italy). The performance has two versions: Opera with chorus and orchestra, that premiered in Italy at Teatro Comunale in Bologna, and Drama version, that premiered at Thèatre Vidy – Lausanne. The music of the performance are by Enzo Avitabile who won the Ubu Prize for them. His last theatre creation, La gioia, premiered in March 2018 and has been presented at Theatre Olympics in Delhi and Bhopal (India), at Hong Kong Arts Festival, in Shizuoka (Japan), in Tunisia, Spain, Portugal. and it will be on tour in the theatrical season 2021/2022.

== Europe Theatre Prize ==
In 2009, he was one of the recipients of the XI Europe Prize Theatrical Realities. The prize organization described Delbono as a "poet of social marginalisation and diversity" and stated that he "has always seen art as a fundamental experience for overcoming desperation".

== Theatre ==
- Il tempo degli assassini (1987)
- Morire di musica (1989)
- Il Muro (1990)
- Henry V, inspired by the text of William Shakespeare (1992)
- La rabbia (1995)
- Barboni (1997)
- Itaca (1998)
- Guerra (1998)
- Her bijit (1999)
- Esodo (1999)
- Il silenzio (2000)
- Gente di plastica (2002)
- Urlo (2004)
- Racconti di Giugno (2005)
- Questo Buio Feroce (2006)
- La Menzogna (2008)
- Storia di un viaggio teatrale (2009)
- Amore e carne (2011)
- Rosso Bordeaux (2011)
- Dopo la battaglia (2011)
- Erpressung / Il ricatto (2012)
- Orchidee (2013)
- Vangelo (2016)
- La gioia (2018)

== Opera ==
- Studio per Obra Maestra at Teatro Lirico Sperimentale Spoleto (2007)
- Cavalleria Rusticana by Pietro Mascagni at Teatro di San Carlo Naples (2012)
- Don Giovanni by Wolfgang Amadeus Mozart at Grand Theatre, Poznań (2014)
- Madama Butterfly by Giacomo Puccini at Teatro di San Carlo Naples (2014 and 2016)
- St John Passion by Johann Sebastian Bach at Teatro Massimo Palermo
- Pagliacci by Ruggero Leoncavallo at Teatro dell'Opera di Roma (2018)

== Awards ==
- 1997 – Premio Ubu

Special Prize for Barboni

- 1998 – Italian Critic's Award

for Guerra

- 2003 – Le Maschere Awards

for Gente di Plastica

- 2004 – David di Donatello

Best Documentary for Guerra

- 2005 – Le Maschere Awards

for Urlo

- 2009 – Europe Theatre Prize - Europe Prize Theatrical Realities
- 2010 – Festival international du court métrage de Clermont-Ferrand

Grand Prix Compétition Internationale for Blue Sofa

- 2011 – Premio Ubu

Best Show for Dopo la Battaglia

- 2012 – Premio Abbiati
- 2012 – Prix spécial du Jury SSR – Festival Vision du réél Nyon

for Amore e Carne

- 2013 – Don Quijote Prize at Locarno Festival

for Sangue

- 2013 – Special Mention Doclisboa

for Sangue

- 2014 – San Giò Video Festival

Best Movie for Sangue

- 2016 – Festival del Cinema del Reale Award

Best Actors Pippo Delbono and Bobò

- 2016 – Grand Prix du Festival Doc en courts de Lyon

for La Visite

- 2016 – It's All True – International Documentary Film Festival São Paulo

Best Short Film for La Visite

== Filmography ==
=== Director ===
- Guerra (2003)
- Grido (2006)
- Blue Sofa (2009) short film
- La paura (2009)
- Amore carne (2011)
- Sangue (2013)
- La Visite (2015)
- Vangelo (2016)

=== Actor ===
Year	Title	Director
2010	I Am Love	Luca Guadagnino
2010	Il sogno del maratoneta	Leone Pompucci
2011	Cavalli	Michele Rho
2012	Goltzius and the Pelican Company	Peter Greenaway
2012	Pulce non c'è	Giuseppe Bonito
2012	Me and You (film)	Bernardo Bertolucci
2013	Cha cha cha	Marco Risi
2013	A Castle in Italy	Valeria Bruni Tedeschi
2013	Transeuropæ Hotel	Luigi Cinque
2013	Henri	Yolande Moreau
2014	Darker Than Midnight	Sebastiano Riso
2014	Rendez-vous à Atlit	Shirel Amitay
2014	United Passions	Frédéric Auburtin
2016	Worldly Girl	Marco Danieli
2016	Ombre della sera	Valentina Esposito
2016	Il camionista	Lucio Gaudino
2016	Falchi	Toni D'Angelo
2017	A Family	Sebastiano Riso
2017	Gli asteroidi	Germano Maccioni
2018	A Tramway in Jerusalem	Amos Gitai
2018	Oltre la nebbia – Il mistero di Rainer Merz	Giuseppe Varlotta
2019	Lucania (film)	Gigi Roccati
2019	La Freccia del Tempo	Carlo Sarti

== Exhibits ==
- Ma mère et les autres, La Maison Rouge, Paris (2014)
- L’Esprit qui ment, Centre Pompidou, Paris (2018)

== Concerts ==
- Amore e carne, with Alexander Balanescu (2011)
- Il sangue, with Petra Magoni and Ilaria Fantin, inspired by Sophocles's Oedipus at Colonus (2013)
- La notte, with Piero Corso, inspired by Bernard-Marie Koltès's La Nuit juste avant les forêts (2014)
- Bestemmia d'amore, with Enzo Avitabile (2014)

== Bibliography ==
- Ghiglione A., Barboni. Il teatro di Pippo Delbono, Ubulibri, Milan, Italy 1999
- Delbono P., Pippo Delbono, mon théâtre, Actes Sud, Arles, France 2004
- Delbono P., Pons H., Le Corps de l'acteur, six entretiens romains avec Hervé Pons, Éditions Les Solitaires Intempestifs, Besançon, France, 2004
- Delbono P., El Teatro de la rabia, Punto a parte, Murcia, Spain, 2005
- Delbono P., Racconti di giugno, Garzanti, Milan, Italy, 2008
- Bentivoglio L., Pippo Delbono.Corpi senza menzogna, Barbés, 2009
- Delbono P., Regards, Actes Sud, Arles, France, 2010
- Bionda N., Gualdoni C., Visioni incrociate. Pippo Delbono tra cinema e teatro Titivillus, Corazzano, Italy, 2011
- Delbono P., Dopo la battaglia. Scritti poetico-politici, Ed. Barbés, 2011
- De Martino A., Puppa p., Toninato P., Differences on stage, Cambridge Scholar Publishing, Newcastle upon Tyne, UK, 2013
- Pizzinant B., Pippo Delbono, le théâtre au temps des assassins, Editions de l'Amandier, Paris, France, 2014
- Delbono P., Pier Paolo Pasolini. Urlare la verità, Clichy, Florence, Italy, 2014
- Delbono P., Senzani G., Sangue. Dialogo tra un artista buddista e un ex terrorista tornato in libertà, Clichy, Florence, Italy, 2014
- Delbono P., David Bowie. L'uomo che cadde sulla terra, Clichy, Florence, Italy, 2016
- Manzella G., La possibilità della gioia, Clichy, Florence, Italy, 2017
- Delbono P., Le don de soi, Actes Sud, Arles, France, 2018
