= Adolfo Margiotta =

Italian actor and comedian (born 1957)

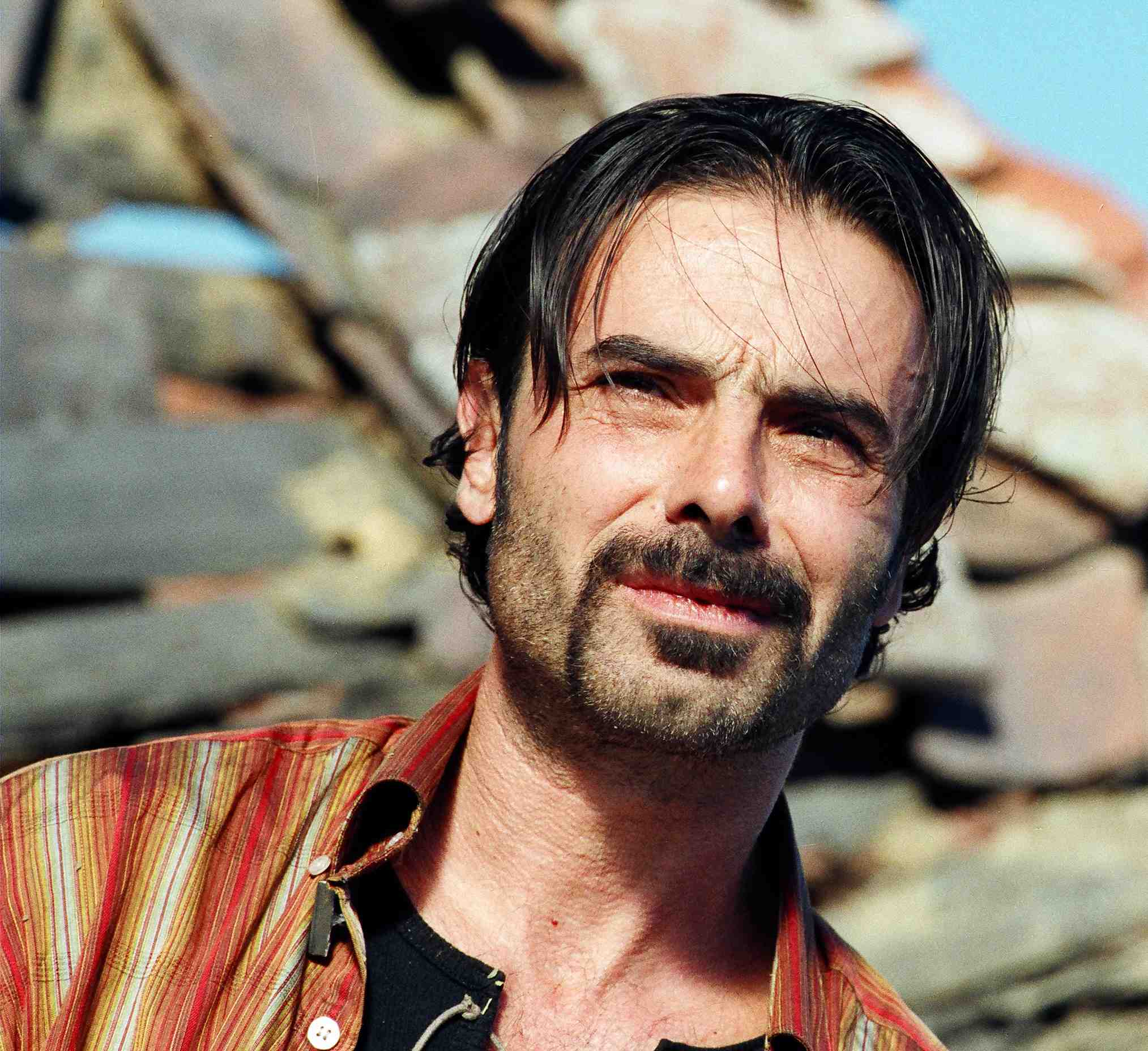
Adolfo Margiotta

Adolfo Margiotta (born 13 September 1957) is an Italian actor and comedian. He was born in Torre del Greco in the Province of Naples.

== Filmography ==
=== Theatre ===
- Permettete che vi legga il mio dramma?, by Anton P. Cechov, directed by Anna Laura Messeri
- Le tre sorelle, by Anton P. Cechov, directed by Octomar Krejca
- L'onesto Jago, by Corrado Augias, directed by Marco Sciaccaluga
- L'Alcalde di Zalamea, by Pedro Calderón de la Barca, directed by Marco Sciaccaluga
- La signorina Giulia, by August Strindberg, directed by Otomar Krejča
- Jacques e il suo padrone, by Denis Diderot, directed by Luca Barbareschi
- La putta onorata, by Carlo Goldoni, directed by Marco Sciaccaluga
- La buona moglie, by Carlo Goldoni, directed by Marco Sciaccaluga
- Marat Sade, by Peter Weiss, directed by Vanni Valenza
- Il latte e il sangue, by Dario G. Martini, directed by B.Orsetti
- La Congiura di Fiesco, by Friedrich Schiller, directed by Mario Menini
- I Cimbelino, di William Shakespeare, directed by Renzo Trotta
- La Commedia da due lire, by Paolo Rossi, directed by Giampiero Solari
- Peggio che andar di notte, by Paolo Rossi, Massimo Olcese, Adolfo Margiotta, and Giampiero Solari, directed by Giampiero Solari
- I paladini di Francia, by Giorgio Campanati, directed by Giorgio Campanati

=== Cinema ===
- Peggio di così si muore, directed by Marcello Cesena (1995)
- Velocipidi ai tropici, directed by David Riondino (1996)
- In principio erano le mutande, directed by Anna Negri (1996)
- La grande prugna, directed by Claudio Malaponti (1999)
- Sulla spiaggia al di là del molo, directed by Giovanni Fago (2000)
- E adesso sesso, directed by Carlo Vanzina (2001)
- Brother Bear, voice of Tuke in Italian version (2003)
- Balcancan, directed by Darko Mitrevski (2005)

=== Television ===
- Avanzi Rai Tre, directed by Franza Di Rosa (1992)
- Tunnel Rai Tre, directed by Franza Di Rosa (1993)
- Producer - il Grande Gioco del Cinema Rai Tre, directed by Franza Di Rosa (1995)
- Pippo Chennedy Show Rai Due, directed by Franza Di Rosa (1996)
- Disokkupati Rai Due, directed by Di Rosa (1997)
- Francamente me ne infischio Rai Uno, directed by Paolo Beldì, con Adriano Celentano (1999)
- Millennium Rai Uno, directed by Stefano Vicario (1999)
- Ciao 2000 Rai Due (2000)

=== Cabaret ===
- Tre Gabbiani, by Adolfo Margiotta, Massimo Olcese and Mauro Pagani, directed by A. Margiotta, M. Olcese and M. Pagani, (1989)
- Vietato ai minori, by Adolfo Margiotta, Massimo Olcese, directed by Adolfo Margiotta (1990)
