= Le Maschere Awards =

Recognition for Italian theatre

Le Maschere Award
- Awarded for: Excellence in Italian theatre
- Country: Italy
- Presented by: Ente Teatrale Italiano (ETI)
- First award: 2003
- Website: enteteatrale.it/

The Le Maschere del Teatro Italiano (The Masks of Italian Theatre), more commonly known informally as the Le Maschere Award in Italian Le Maschere, recognizes achievement in live Italian theatre is the national theatre award of Italy. The awards are presented and decided by the Ente Teatrale Italiano (ETI) and supported by the Italian Ministry of Culture at an annual ceremony in Naples. The awards are given for Italian productions and performances.

The Le Maschere Awards are considered the highest Italy theatre honor, the Italy theatre industry's equivalent to the American Tony Award in live productions in the US, the Molière Award in France or the Olivier Award for theatre in UK.

== History ==
Created in 2003 by desire of the ETI, the Teatro Stabile del Veneto and Italian Ministry of Culture in collaboration with the Veneto region and the town of Vicenza, this annual award marks the boundary between the season theatrical ended and that we are going to open. Set as the Oscars of the cinema, the awards are divided into categories, each of which has a set of three finalists (the nomination) selected by a committee of experts (artists, critics and institutional personalities with President outside the world of entertainment). The winner will be chosen by a jury composed of 300 artists and professionals in the Italian theater. The first phase of the prize (the creation of the nomination) takes place in Rome at the headquarters of the ETI. The artists of backhoe loaders are also received in the Quirinal by the President of the Republic . The second phase will be held in Venice, at the headquarters of the Teatro Stabile del Veneto.

== Ceremonies ==
The awards ceremony takes place generally in September in the Teatro Olimpico in Vicenza (hence the name of the prize). Since the first edition of the ceremony was presented by Tullio Solenghi and deferred broadcast live on Rai Uno. The 2009 edition saw instead in the role of conductor Massimo Ranieri.

Since 2011, the Napoli Teatro Festival organizes the award too, in collaboration with the AGIS (Association of Italian General Entertainment), renewing the tradition of the Premio Eti - The Olympic Theatre. Prizes are awarded in the frame of the Teatro San Carlo in Naples.

=== 2003-2004 ===
Ceremony held on Saturday, October 2.

- Best show of prose: The Miser, directed by Gabriele Lavia
- Best musical or comedy music: The singing of the shepherds directed by Barra, Memoli and Cannavacciuolo
- Best show of innovation: Fairy Tales of Oscar Wilde, directed by Giancarlo Sepe
- Best Actor: Roberto Herlitzka for let me go mother and the exhibition
- Best Actress: Maria Paiato for Dear Professor and The Memoirs of water
- Best Supporting Actor: Valerio Binasco for Oedipus at Colonus
- Best Supporting Actress: Franca Valeri for the gamester
- Best Actor / Actress: Fausto Russo Alesi for The gray ex aequo with Gaia Aprea for Georges Dandin, Memories and Iphigenia in Tauris
- Best interpreter of monologue or "One Man Show": Adriana Asti to Tell and Nott - Stramilano
- Best Director: Gabriele Lavia for The Miser
- Best Director: Maurizio Balò for When you are someone and Tonight we improvise
- Best Costume: Silvia Polidori for The Visit of the Old Lady
- Best author of music: Arturo Annechino for Volpone, Tonight we improvise and when someone is
- Best Italian author of novelty: Beppe Lanzetta and Vincenzo Pirrotta for Malaluna

=== 2005 ===
Awards ceremony held on Friday 30 September.

- Best show of prose: Professor Bernhardi directed by Luca Ronconi
- Best musical or comedy music: Concha Bonita directed by Alfredo Arias
- Best show of innovation: Scream directed by Pippo Delbono
- Best Actor: Massimo De Francovich for Professor Bernhardi and Paolo Borsellino State being
- Best Actress: Mariangela Spalato for Who's Afraid of Virginia Woolf and the centaur
- Best Supporting Actor: Paolo Graziosi for Six Characters in Search of an Author
- Best Supporting Actress: Anita Bartolucci for Well-being
- Best Actor / Actress: Marco Foschi for Trilogy Paolini, Edward II and Romeo and Juliet ex aequo with Antonia Truppo for Six Characters in Search of an Author
- Best interpreter of monologue or "One Man Show": Giancarlo Condè for the king's jester Rigoletto ex aequo with Ottavia Piccolo for Land of milk and honey
- Best Director: Luca Ronconi for Professor Bernhardi and the centaur
- Best Director: Margherita Palli for Professor Bernhardi and the centaur
- Best Costume: Gabriele Mayer for The centaur
- Best author of music: Germano Mazzocchetti for Memories, a snack General, King Lear, Alcestis and The Persians
- Best Italian author of novelty: Davide Enia for Scanna, May '43 and Brazil 3 Italy 2
- Special Prize of the President of the Commission for Nominations: Armando Trovajoli

=== 2006 ===
Awards ceremony held on Friday 15 September.

- Best show of prose: Death of a Salesman, directed by Marco Sciaccaluga
- Best musical or comedy musical The Producers directed by Saverio Marconi
- Best show of innovation: Other happy days directed by Claudio Remondi and Riccardo Caporossi
- Best Actor: Eros Pagni for Death of a Salesman
- Best Actress: Giulia Lazzarini for more happy days
- Best Supporting Actor: Ugo Maria Morosi for Death of a Salesman
- Best Supporting Actress: Sara Bertelà for The illusion comic
- Best Actor / Actress: Federica Di Martino for The shape of things
- Best interpreter of monologue or "One Man Show": Paola Cortellesi for The last shall be last
- Best Director: Marco Sciaccaluga for Death of a Salesman
- Best Director: Emanuele Luzzati for The Bridge of San Louis Ray
- Best Costume: Odette Nicoletti for The vindictive woman
- Best author of music: Ramberto Ciammarughi for Feast of the Lord of the Ship
- Best author of novelty Italian: Vittorio Franceschi for Daphne's smile
- Special Prize of the President of the Commission for Nominations: Rossella Falk

=== 2007 ===
Awards ceremony held on Friday 14 September.

- Best show of prose: The longings for vacationing directed by Elena Bucci
- Best musical or comedy musical Chateder directed by Armando Pugliese
- Best show of innovation: Rome 11 am directed by Mandracchia, Real, Toffolatti, Torres
- Best Actor: Paolo Poli for you brilliant
- Best Actress: Ottavia Piccolo for Trial of God
- Best Supporting Actor: Massimo Verdastro for Birds
- Best Supporting Actress: Anna Bonaiuto to invent it out of whole cloth
- Best Actor / Actress: Francesco Bonomo for Measure for Measure ex aequo with Federica Fracassi for The Orphan Muses
- Best interpreter of monologue or "One Man Show" Maria Paiato for A simple heart
- Best Director: Pier Luigi Pizzi for one of the last evenings of Carnival
- Best Director: Enrico Job for entries in
- Best Costume: Silvia Polidori for Chateder
- Best author of music: Enzo Gragnianiello for Chateder
- Best author of novelty Italian: Edoardo Erba for Margherita and the cock
- Special Prize of the President of the Commission for Nominations: Carlo Giuffrè

=== 2008 ===
Awards ceremony held on Wednesday, September 10.

- Best show of prose: Angels in America, directed by Ferdinando Bruni and Elio De Capitani
- Best musical or comedy music: There we darem hand directed by Roberto De Simone
- Best show of innovation: ' Nzularchia directed by Carlo Cerciello
- Best Actor: Massimo Popolizio for Ritter, Dene, Voss
- Best Actress: Mascia Musy for Anna Karenina
- Best Supporting Actor: Gigio Morra for Holiday Trilogy
- Best Supporting Actress: Leda Negroni for Elettra
- Best Actor / Actress: Anna Della Rosa for Holiday Trilogy
- Best interpreter of monologue or "One Man Show": Roberto Herlitzka for Ex Hamlet eD Oedipus at Colonus
- Best Director: Ferdinando Bruni and Elio De Capitani for Angels in America
- Best Director: Roberto Crea for ' Nzularchia
- Best Costume: Franca Squarciapino for the family of the antiquarian
- Best author of music: Antonio Di Pofi for fasting is prohibited on the beach, the family of the antiquarian and The Merchant of Venice
- Best of novelty Italian author: Roberto Saviano and Mario Gelardi for Gomorrah
- Special Prize of the President of the Commission for Nominations: Anna Proclemer

=== 2009 ===
Awards ceremony held on Friday September 11.

- Best show of prose: Dream of a Midsummer Night directed by Luca Ronconi
- Best Musical or Comedy Musical: The Road directed by Marco Venturiello
- Best show of innovation: Chiove directed by Francesco Saporito
- Best Actor: Alessandro Gassman for Angry Men
- Best Actress: Giuliana Lojodice for conversations of Anna K.
- Best Supporting Actor: Gennaro Cannavacciuolo to always tell him yes
- Best Supporting Actress: Anita Bartolucci for Oedipus
- Best Actor / Actress: Valentina Capone for Sun, the dream of Giruziello
- Best interpreter of monologue or "One Man Show": Roberto Battiston for Orson Well's Rost
- Best Director: Carmelo Rifici for Chie Chan and The suitors
- Best Director: Graziano Gregori for Pinocchio
- Best Costume: Sabrina Chiocchio for the road
- Best author of music: Germano Mazocchetti for the road work and women informed about the facts
- Best of novelty Italian author: Andrea Camilleri - Giuseppe Dipasquale for The brewer of Preston
- Special Prize of the President of the Commission for Nominations: Franca Valeri

=== 2011 ===
- Best show of prose: The giants of the mountain, directed by Enzo Vetrano and Stefano Randisi
- Best Director: Giancarlo Sepe for Bite of the new moon
- Best Actor: Ugo Pagliai for Waiting for Godot
- Best Actress: Mariangela Spalato for Nora to the test
- Best Supporting Actor: Filippo Dini for Romeo and Juliet
- Best Supporting Actress: Giulia Lazzarini for Donna Rosita maiden
- Best Actor / Actress: Massimo De Matteo for Lies with long legs
- Best interpreter of monologue: Fabrizio Gifuni for Engineer Gadda goes to war
- Best Director: Maurizio Balò for Andromache
- Best Costume: Santuzza Cali for The sea
- Best author of music: Antonio Di Pofi for Andromache
- Best of novelty Italian author: Luca De Bei for the mornings ten to four
- Special award to the memory of Graziella Lonardi Bontempi: Claudio Gubitosi
- Special Prize of the President: Massimo Ranieri

=== 2012 ===
- Best show of prose: The Coast of Utopia, directed by Marco Tullio Giordana
- Best Director: Elio De Capitani, Ferdinando Bruni for The History Boys
- Best Actor: Luigi Lo Cascio for Diceria dell'untore
- Best Actress: Laura Marinoni for A Streetcar Named Desire
- Best Supporting Actor: Ugo Maria Morosi for The Threepenny Opera
- Best Supporting Actress: Elisabetta Valgoi for A Streetcar Named Desire
- Best Actor / Actress: Filippo Nigro for West solitary
- Best interpreter of monologue: Anna Maria Guarnieri for Eleanor, last night in Pittsburgh
- Best Director: Alessandro Camera for Everything for good
- Best Costume: Francesca Sartori, Elizabeth Old for The Coast of Utopia
- Best author of music: Germano Mazzocchetti for The Merry Wives of Windsor
- Best author of novelty Italian: Vincenzo Pirrotta for Diceria dell'untore
- Special award to the memory of Graziella Lonardi Bontempi: Claudio Gubitosi
- Special Prize of the President: Massimo Ranieri

=== 2013 ===
- Best show of prose: The voices within, directed by Toni Servillo
- Best Director: Toni Servillo for entries in
- Best Actor: Toni Servillo for entries in
- Best Actress: Sara Bertelà for Exit
- Best Supporting Actor: Peppe Servillo for entries in
- Best Supporting Actress: Chiara Baffi for entries in
- Best interpreter of monologue: Michela Cescon for Leonilde, great story of an ordinary woman
- Best Director: Simone Mannino for There's crying in these tears
- Best Costume: Simona D'Amico for There's crying in these tears
- Best author of music: Nicola Piovani for the evening Settler
- Best Italian author of novelty: Valeria Parrella for Antigone
- Special award to the memory of Graziella Lonardi Bontempi: National Institute of Ancient Drama
- Special Prize of the President: Eros Pagni
