= Disokkupati =

- Genre: Sitcom
- Created by: Valentina Amurri; Linda Brunetta; Pier Francesco Loche
- Directed by: Franza Di Rosa
- Starring: Paolo Ferrari; Sabrina Impacciatore; Pier Francesco Loche; Adolfo Margiotta
- Country of origin: Italy
- Original language: Italian
- No. of seasons: 1
- No. of episodes: 40

Original release
- Network: Rai 2
- Release: October 26 – December 20, 1997

Disokkupati is a 1997 Italian sitcom created by Valentina Amurri, Linda Brunetta and Pier Francesco Loche, and directed by Franza Di Rosa.

== Cast ==
- Paolo Ferrari as Amelio Spina
- Sabrina Impacciatore as Caterina
- Pierfrancesco Loche as Ignazio Settimo Porcu
- Adolfo Margiotta as Speranzo Zammataro
- Stefano Masciarelli as Mario
- Francesca Reggiani as Cesca
- Antonio Catania as Osservatore di Pavia

== See also ==
- List of Italian television series
