= The Quai Saint-Michel and Notre-Dame =

1901 painting by Maximilien Luce

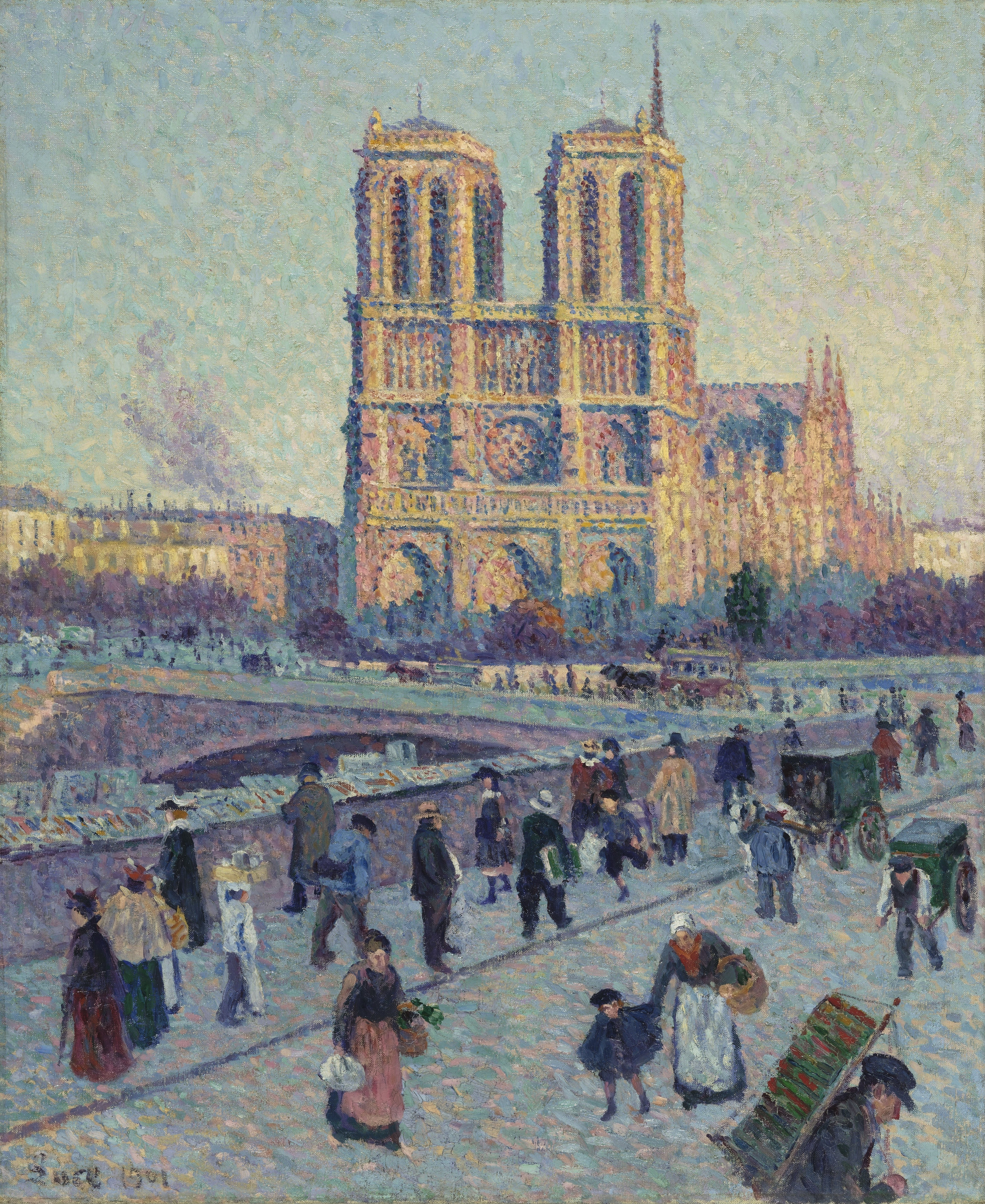
- Artist: Maximilien Luce
- Year: 1901
- Medium: Oil on canvas
- Dimensions: 73 cm × 60 cm (29 in × 24 in)
- Location: Musée d'Orsay, Paris
- Website: musee-orsay.fr/...231

The Quai Saint-Michel and Notre-Dame is a 1901 oil on canvas painting by the French artist Maximilien Luce. Luce was part of the Neo-Impressionist movement between 1887 and 1897 and used the technique of employing separate dabs of color (divisionism), for the painting, which was one of ten he undertook of Notre-Dame de Paris. The Musée d'Orsay in Paris, which holds the image as of 2015, notes that this was painted by Luce when he was moving from his Neo-Impressionist period to his later Populist period. The Musée d'Orsay obtained the picture in 1981.
