= Émile-Gustave Cavallo-Péduzzi =

French painter

- Born: Émile-Gustave Cavallo-Péduzzi; 1851; Paris, France
- Died: 1917 (aged 65–66)
- Known for: Painter
- Movement: Groupe de Lagny

Émile-Gustave Cavallo-Péduzzi (1851–1917) was a French pointillist painter, and part of the Groupe de Lagny art collective.

== Life ==
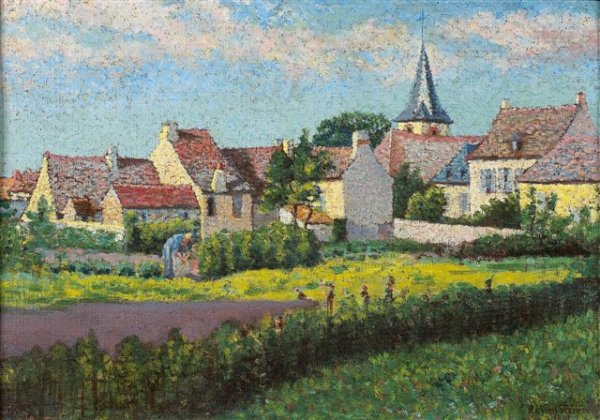
Vue de Guermantes, 1891

Cavallo-Péduzzi was born in Montmartre, Paris and studied at the École des beaux-arts, and in the studio of Jean-Léon Gérôme and Eugène Froment. He became a founding member of the Groupe de Lagny with Léo Gausson, Maximilien Luce and Lucien Pissarro, who painted in a pointillist style. In In 1899 he became a founding member of the Union Artistique et Littéraire du canton de Lagny.

He died in Lagny-sur-Marne in 1917.

== See also ==
- History of painting
- Western painting

== Webink ==
- Émile-Gustave Cavallo-Péduzzi on Arcadja.com
