= Maximilien Luce =

French painter (1858–1941)

- Born: Maximilien-Jules-Constant Luce; 13 March 1858; Paris, France
- Died: 6 February 1941 (aged 82); Paris, France
- Known for: Painting
- Movement: Neo-Impressionism

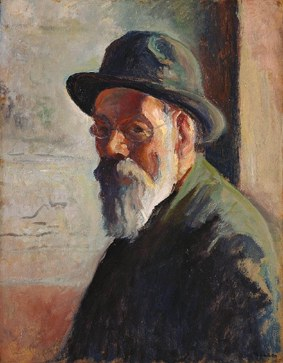
Self-portrait, c. 1925–1930

Maximilien Luce (French pronunciation: [maksimiljɛ̃ lys]; 13 March 1858–6 February 1941) was a French Neo-impressionist artist known for his paintings, graphic art, and his anarchist activism. Starting as a wood-engraver, he subsequently concentrated on painting, first as an Impressionist, then as a Pointillist, and finally returning to Impressionism.

== Early life and education ==
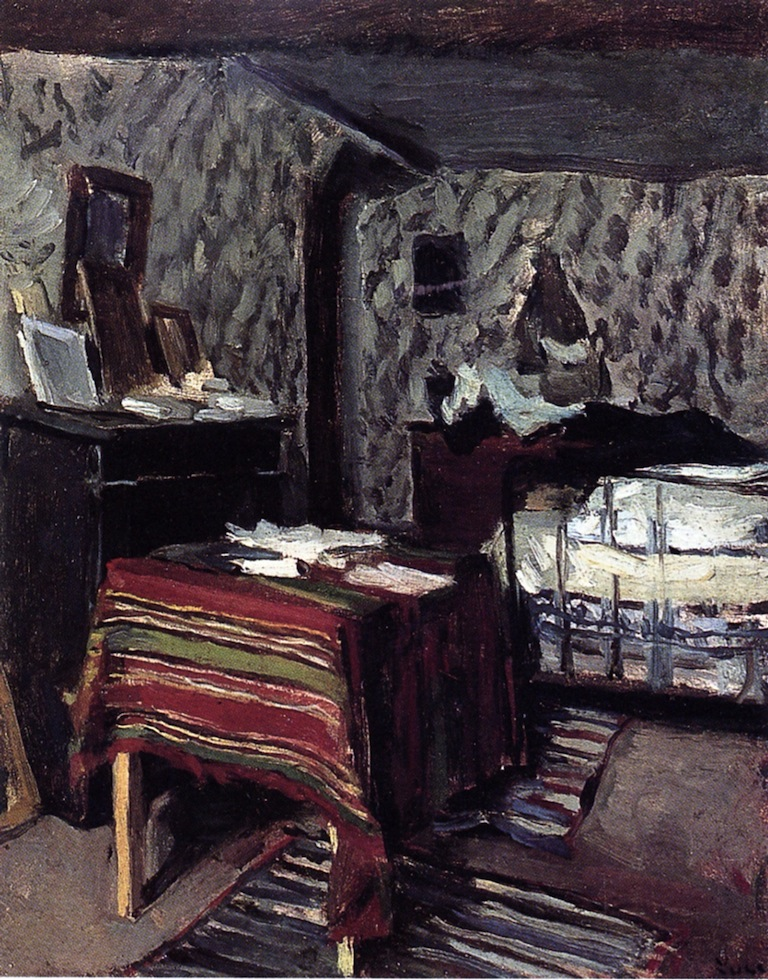
The Artist's Room, rue Lavin, 1878

Maximilien-Jules-Constant Luce was born on 13 March 1858 in Paris. His parents, of modest means, were Charles-Désiré Luce (1823–1888), a railway clerk, and Louise-Joséphine Dunas (1822–1878). The family lived in the Montparnasse, a working-class district of Paris. Luce attended school at l'Ecole communale, beginning in 1864.

In 1872, the 14 year-old Luce became an apprentice with wood-engraver Henri Théophile Hildebrand (1824–1897). During his three-year xylography apprenticeship, he also took night classes in drawing from instructors Truffet and Jules-Ernest Paris (1827–1895). During this period, Luce started painting in oils. He moved with his family to the southern Paris suburb of Montrouge. His art education continued as he attended drawing classes taught by Diogène Maillard (1840–1926) at the Gobelins tapestry factory.

Luce began working in the studio of Eugène Froment (1844–1900) in 1876, producing wood-engravings for various publications including L'Illustration and London's The Graphic. He took additional art courses at l'Académie Suisse, as well as in the studio of portrait painter Carolus-Duran (1837–1917). Through Froment's studio, Luce became friends with Léo Gausson and Émile-Gustave Cavallo-Péduzzi. These three artists spent time around Lagny-sur-Marne creating Impressionist landscapes.

== Work ==
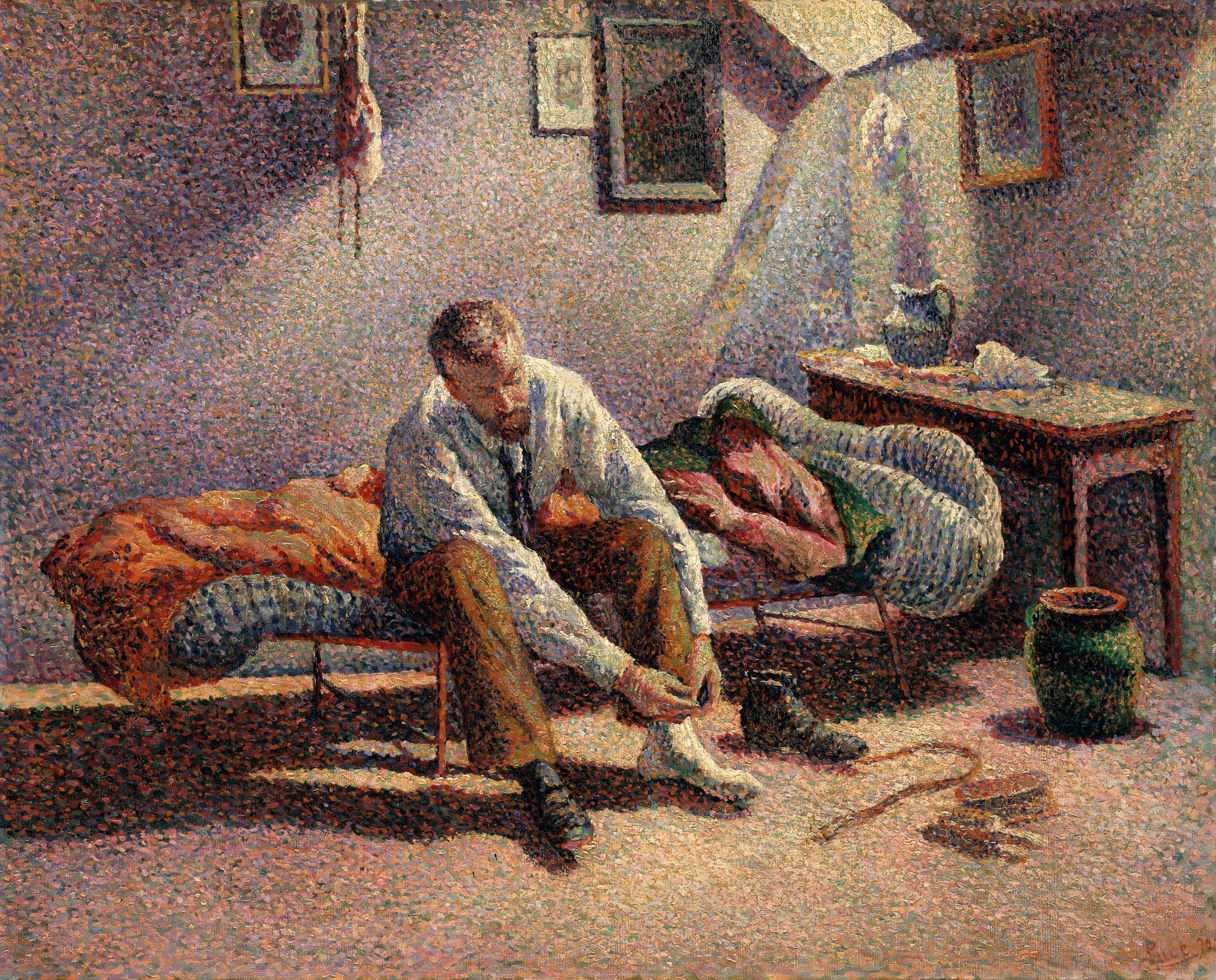
Morning, Interior. The painting represents a close friend and a fellow Neo-Impressionist Gustave Perrot.

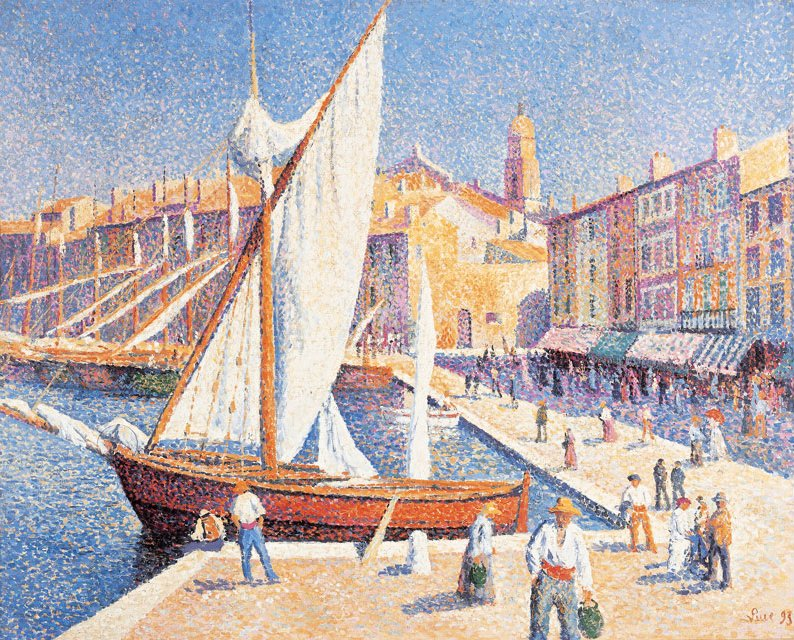
The port of Saint-Tropez, 1893

Luce spent four years in the military, starting in 1879, serving in Brittany at Guingamp. The next year, he received a promotion to corporal, and he became friends with Alexandre Millerand, who, in 1920, assumed the office of President of France. In 1881 he requested the restoration of his lower rank of soldier, second class. Carolus-Duran used his influence to get a transfer for Luce to Paris barracks. His stint in the military came to a close in 1883.

The prevalence of the new zincography printing process rendered xylography nearly obsolete as a profession. When the opportunities for employment as an engraver became scarce, Luce shifted his focus to painting full-time in about 1883.

Gausson and Cavallo-Péduzzi introduced Luce in about 1884 to the Divisionist technique developed by Georges Seurat. This influenced Luce to begin painting in the Pointillist style. In contrast to Seurat's detached manner, Luce's paintings were passionate portrayals of contemporary subjects, depicting the "violent effects of light". He moved to Montmartre in 1887. Luce joined the Société des Artistes Indépendants and participated in their third spring exhibition, where Paul Signac purchased one of his pieces, La Toilette. Camille Pissarro and critic Félix Fénéon were also impressed by the seven Luce works displayed in the show. Fénéon characterized Luce as a "coarse, honest man, with a rough and muscular talent." In addition to Pissarro and Signac, he met many of the other Neo-impressionists, including Seurat, Henri-Edmond Cross, Charles Angrand, Armand Guillaumin, Hippolyte Petitjean, Albert Dubois-Pillet, and Pissarro's son, Lucien. A New York Times critic declared this Pointillist period to be the pinnacle of Luce's artistic career, singling out the radiant 1895 painting On the Bank of the Seine at Poissy as an example. He described the skillfully executed painting as "a lyrical celebration of nature."

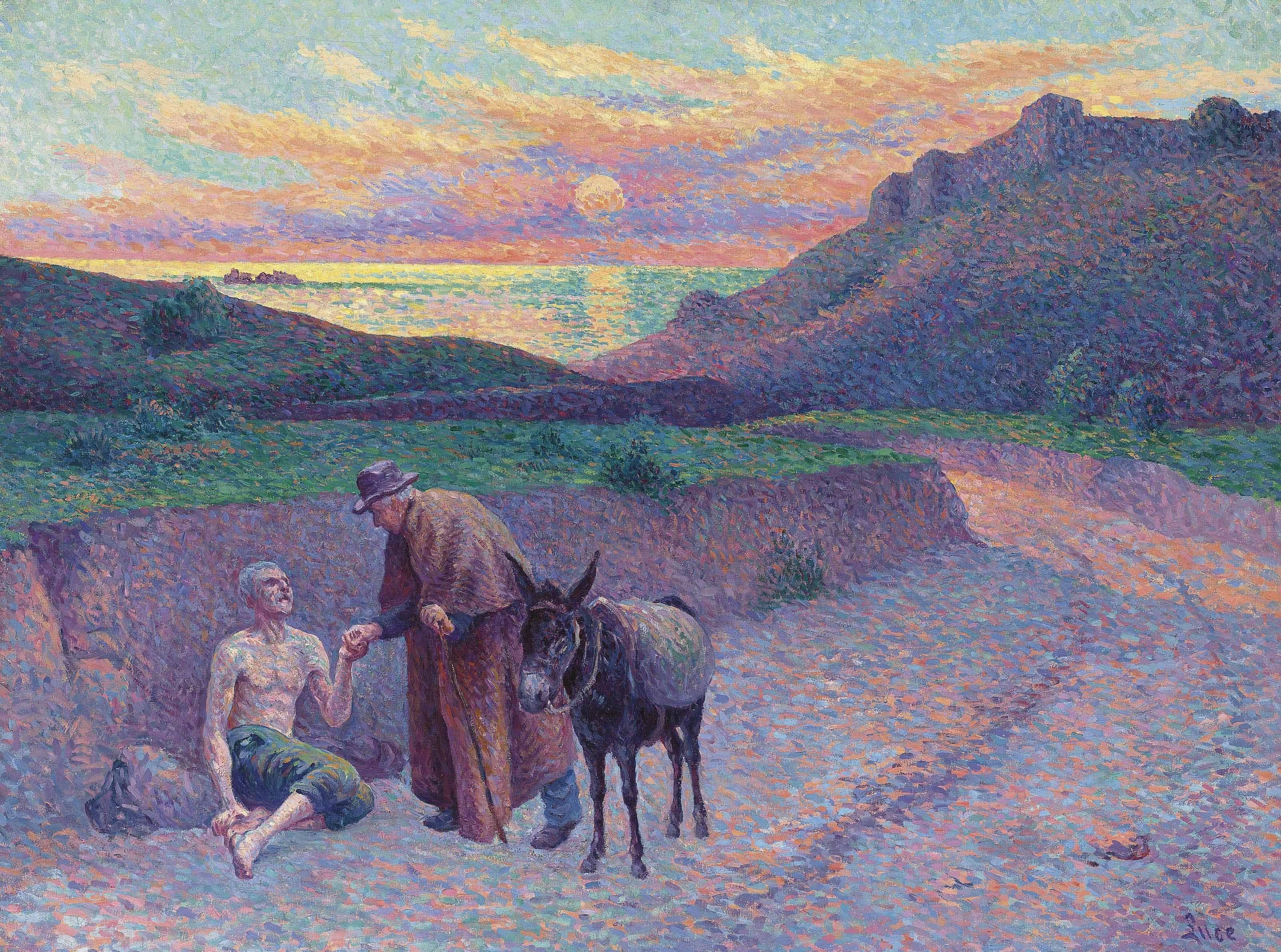
Le bon samaritain, 1896

With the exception of the years 1915 to 1919, Luce exhibited in every show at Les Indépendants from 1887 until he died in 1941, including a thirty-year retrospective held in 1926. In 1909, he was elected vice president of the Société des Artistes Indépendants and was elected president in 1935, following the death of Signac, who had held the post since 1908. However, in 1940 he resigned from the position as a protest against the Vichy regime's laws which would have prohibited Jewish artists from participating in the group. Luce had his first solo exhibition, arranged by Fénéon, in July 1888, exhibiting ten paintings at the La Revue indépendante offices. He showed six paintings at the 1889 Les XX exhibition in Brussels. While there, he met Les XX official Octave Maus, as well as Symbolist poet Emile Verhaeren and fellow Neo-impressionist painter Théo van Rysselberghe. Luce's work was also featured in the ninth Les XX exhibition, in 1892.

In the spring of 1892 Luce traveled with Pissarro to London. Later that year he visited Saint-Tropez with Signac, and in the summer of 1893 he went to Brittany.

Luce's friendship with Pissarro also extended to the Pissarro family home at Éragny-sur-Epte, which he visited repeatedly. On 10 June 1893, Camille Pissarro wrote to his son Lucien that he was returning to Éragny accompanied by Luce; in January 1894 Luce was again staying with the Pissarro family there. The Musée des impressionnismes Giverny describes Luce as one of the “regular visitors” to Pissarro's garden at Éragny. Their friendship continued: after the death of Luce's first child in 1895, Luce and his partner stayed with the Pissarros at Éragny, where he likely made a series of intimate studies of the Pissarro family.

In the early part of the twentieth century his identification with the Neo-impressionists began to disappear, as he became less active politically and his artistic style shifted from Neo-impressionism, and he resumed painting in an Impressionist manner. Some of his paintings during this period depicted wounded World War I soldiers arriving from the battlefront to Paris.

Luce depicted a diverse range of subjects in his works over a long career. He most frequently created landscapes, but his other works include portraits; still lifes (especially florals); domestic scenes such as bathers; and images of welders, rolling mill operators, and other laborers.

== Anarchism ==
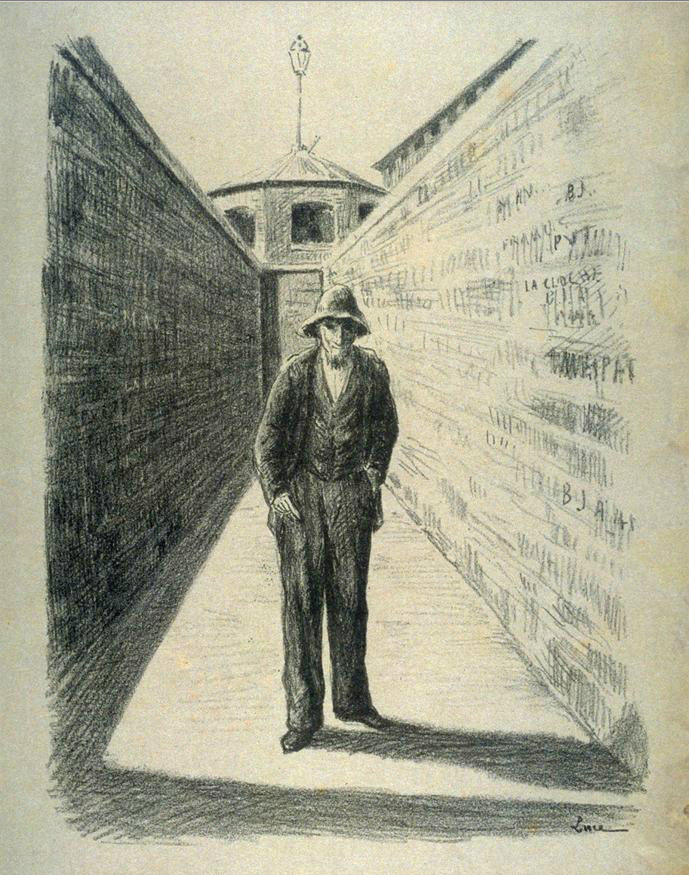
Félix Fénéon at Mazas, 1894

Luce aligned with the Neo-impressionists not only in their artistic techniques, but also in their political philosophy of anarchism. Many of his illustrations were featured in socialist periodicals, notably La Révolte, Jean Grave's magazine which was later called Les Temps nouveaux. Other socialist/anarchist publications which he contributed to include Le Père Peinard, Le Chambard, and La Guerre sociale. On 8 July 1894, Luce, suspected of involvement in the 24 June assassination of President of France Marie François Sadi Carnot, was arrested and was confined to Mazas Prison. He was released forty two days later, on 17 August, following his acquittal at the Procès des trente. He published Mazas, an album consisting of ten lithographs documenting the experiences of himself and other political prisoners incarcerated in Mazas; accompanying the lithographs was text by Jules Vallès. In 1896, while King Alfonso XIII of Spain was visiting Paris, the police detained Luce on the grounds that he was a "dangerous anarchist".

Luce's choice of subject matter for his art was often rooted in his political beliefs. Through his paintings, he passionately demonstrated empathy and fellowship with the proletariat.

== Family ==
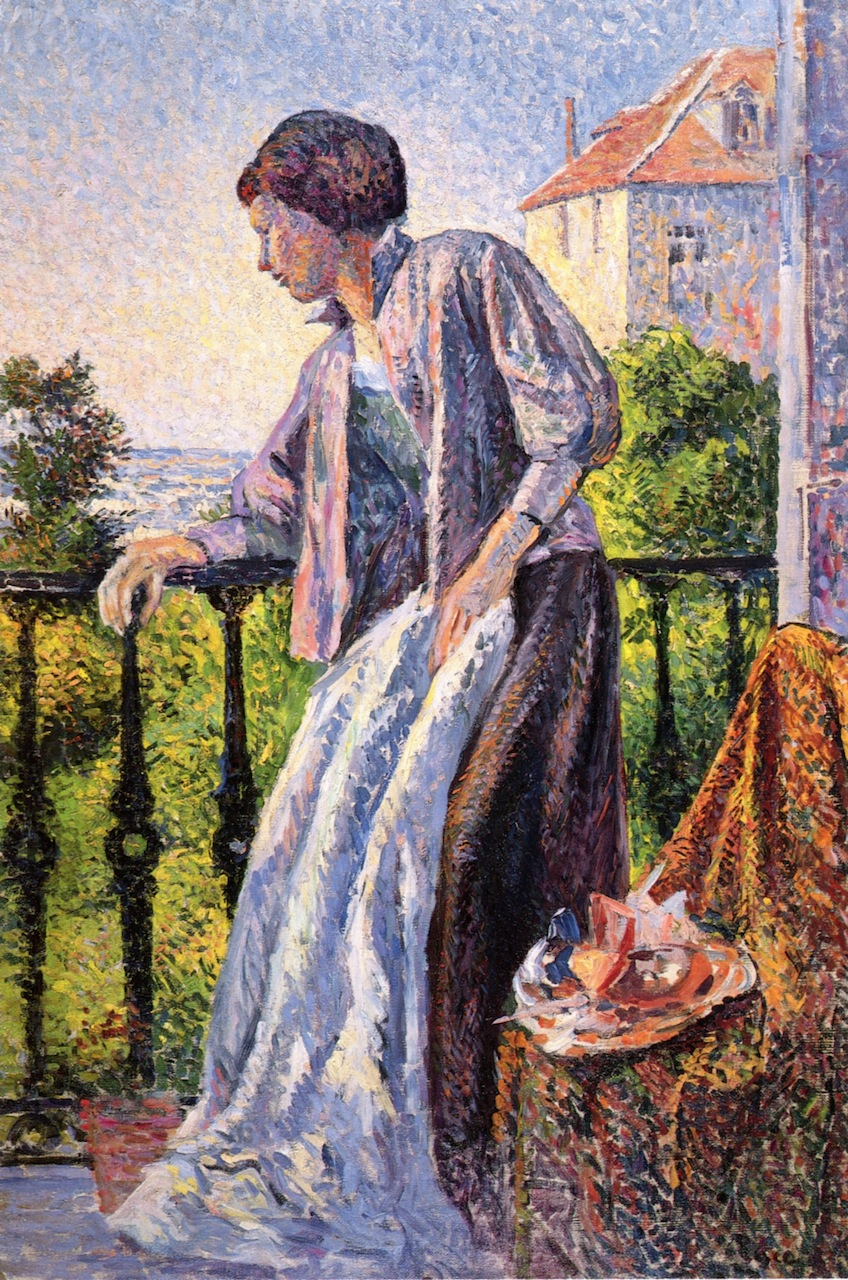
Madame Luce on the Balcony, 1893

In 1893, Luce met Ambroisine "Simone" Bouin in Paris. She became his model, companion, common-law wife, and wife. Bouin was usually referred to as "Madame Luce", even before their eventual marriage. She was frequently a model for him, appearing in many of his works, often partially or fully nude, other times depicted in scenes such as on a balcony or combing her hair. The couple's first son, Frédérick, was born on 5 June 1894, but he died fifteen months later, on 2 September 1895. Following the child's death, Luce and his partner stayed with Camille Pissarro and his family at Éragny-sur-Epte. Their second child, whom they also named Frédérick, was born in 1896. In 1903, they adopted Ambroisine's nephew, Georges Édouard Bouin, who had become orphaned. The couple were married on 30 March 1940 in Paris. Ambroisine died in Rolleboise shortly afterward, on 7 June 1940.

== Death and assessment ==
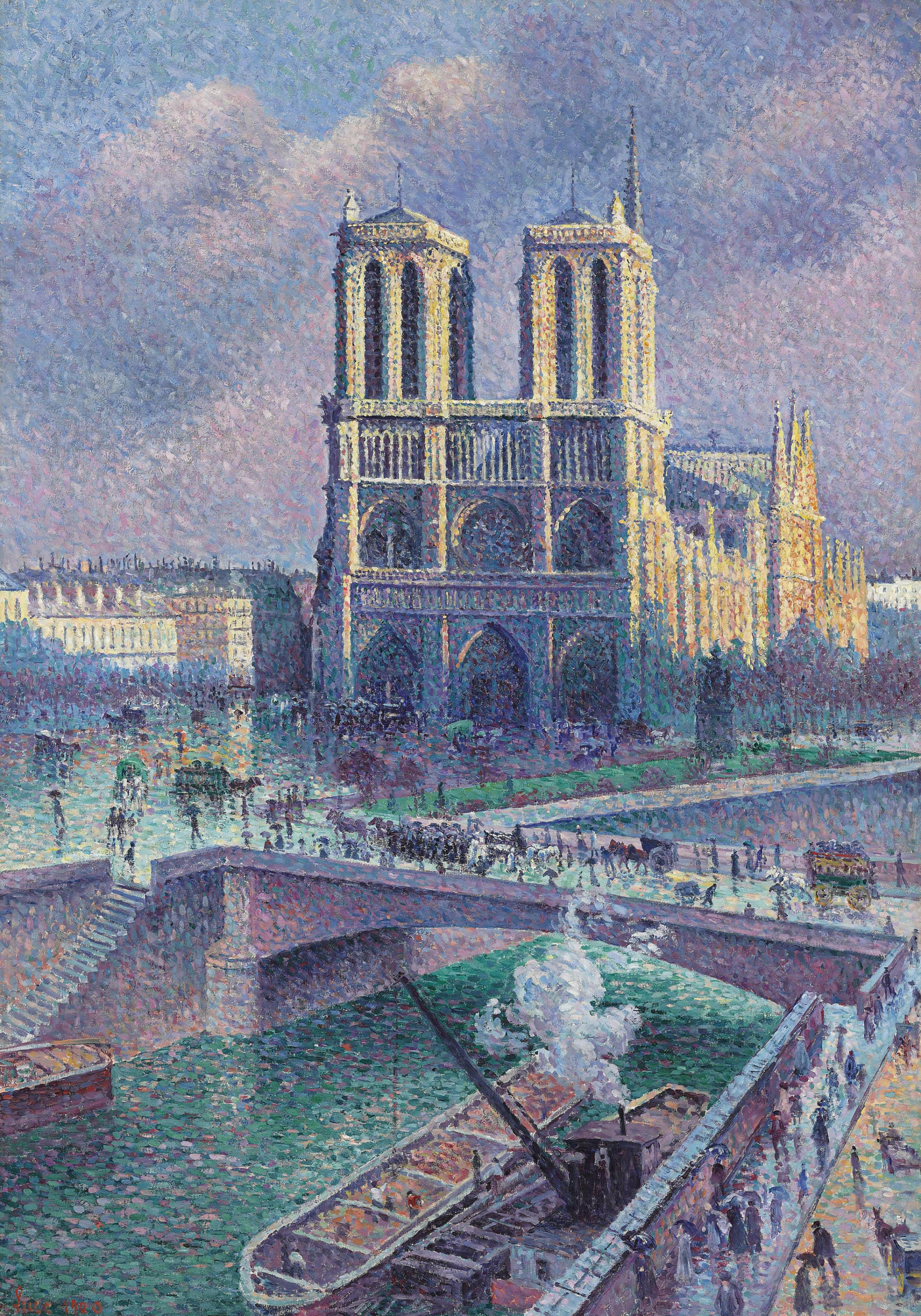
Notre Dame de Paris, 1900

Luce died at his Paris home on 7 February 1941 at the age of 82. He was buried in Rolleboise. In May 1941, the Bibliothèque nationale de France held a memorial exhibition. Another memorial exhibition was mounted at Les Indépendants from March to April 1942.

Luce was among the most productive of the Neo-impressionists, creating over 2,000 oil paintings, a comparably large number of watercolors, gouaches, pastels, and drawings, plus over a hundred prints.

The Musée d'Orsay assesses Luce as "one of the best representatives of the neo-impressionist movement". Although he had many solo exhibitions of his work in France, his first in the United States occurred in 1997 with a retrospective at Wildenstein & Company in Manhattan.

Notre Dame de Paris, painted in 1900, sold at auction in May 2011 for US$4,200,000, setting a record for a Luce work.

== Collections ==
Public collections containing Luce's work include:

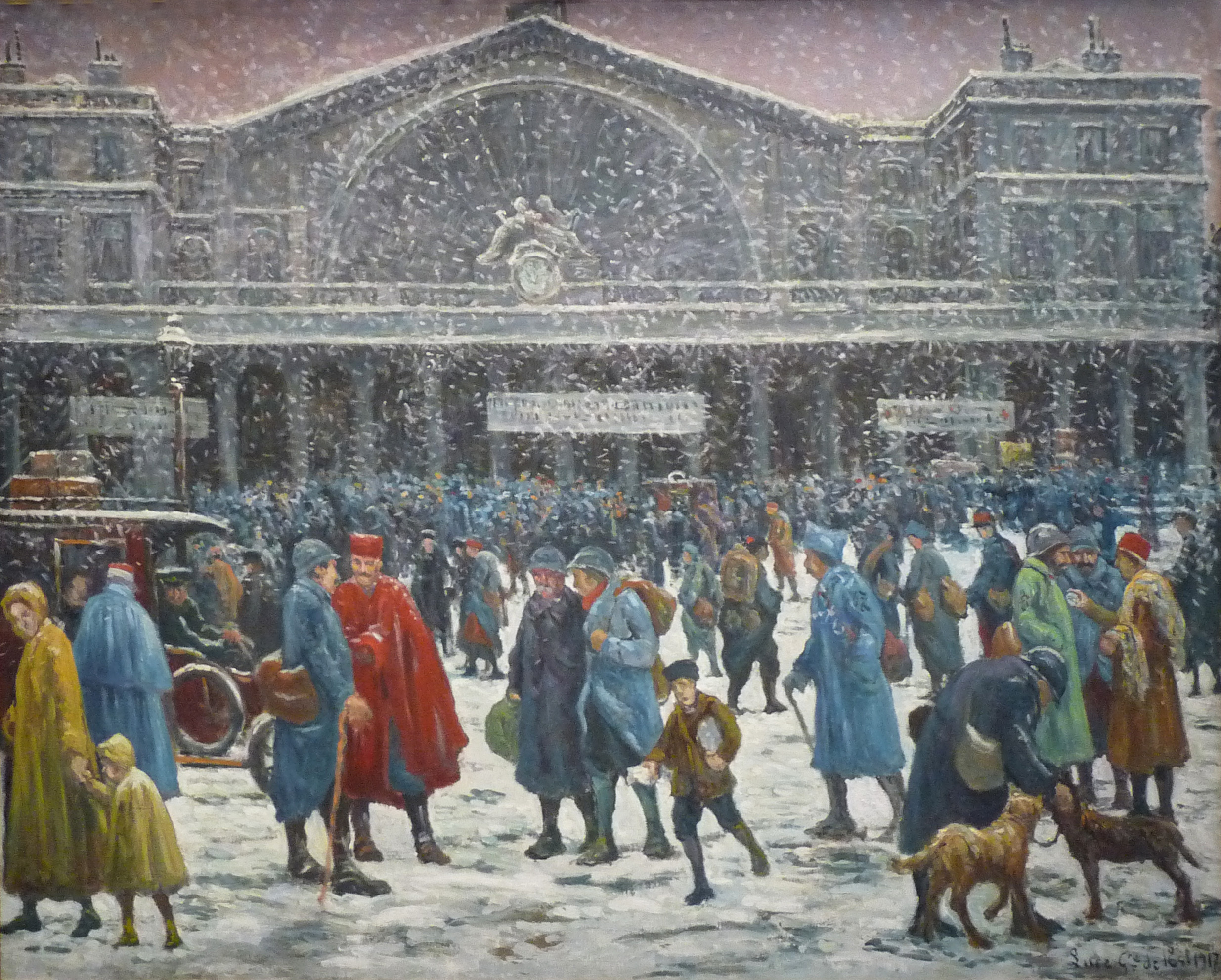
La Gare de l'Est in snow, 1917, Musée de l'Hôtel-Dieu

- Art Institute of Chicago
- Benton Museum of Art at Pomona College
- Cleveland Museum of Art
- Davis Museum and Cultural Center (Wellesley College)
- Dixon Gallery and Gardens
- Fine Arts Museums of San Francisco
- Harvard University Art Museums
- High Museum (Atlanta, Georgia)
- Honolulu Museum of Art
- Indiana University Art Museum (Bloomington)
- Indianapolis Museum of Art
- Kröller-Müller Museum (Otterlo, Netherlands)
- Los Angeles County Museum of Art
- Memphis Brooks Museum of Art
- Metropolitan Museum of Art
- Michele and Donald D'Amour Museum of Fine Arts (Springfield, Massachusetts, U.S.A.)
- Minneapolis Institute of Arts
- Musée d'art moderne (Troyes)
- Musée de l'Annonciade (Saint-Tropez)
- Musée des Beaux-Arts de Rouen
- Musée des Impressionnismes (Giverny)
- Musée d'Orsay
- Musée Lambinet (Versailles)
- The Museum of Fine Arts, Houston
- Museum of Grenoble
- Museum Barberini (Potsdam, Germany)
- New Art Gallery (Walsall, United Kingdom)
- Palazzo Ruspoli (Rome)
- Portland Museum of Art (Maine)
- Princeton University Art Museum
- Saint Louis Art Museum (Missouri)
- San Diego Museum of Art (California)
- Thyssen-Bornemisza Museum (Madrid)
- Wallraf-Richartz Museum (Cologne, Germany)

== Gallery ==
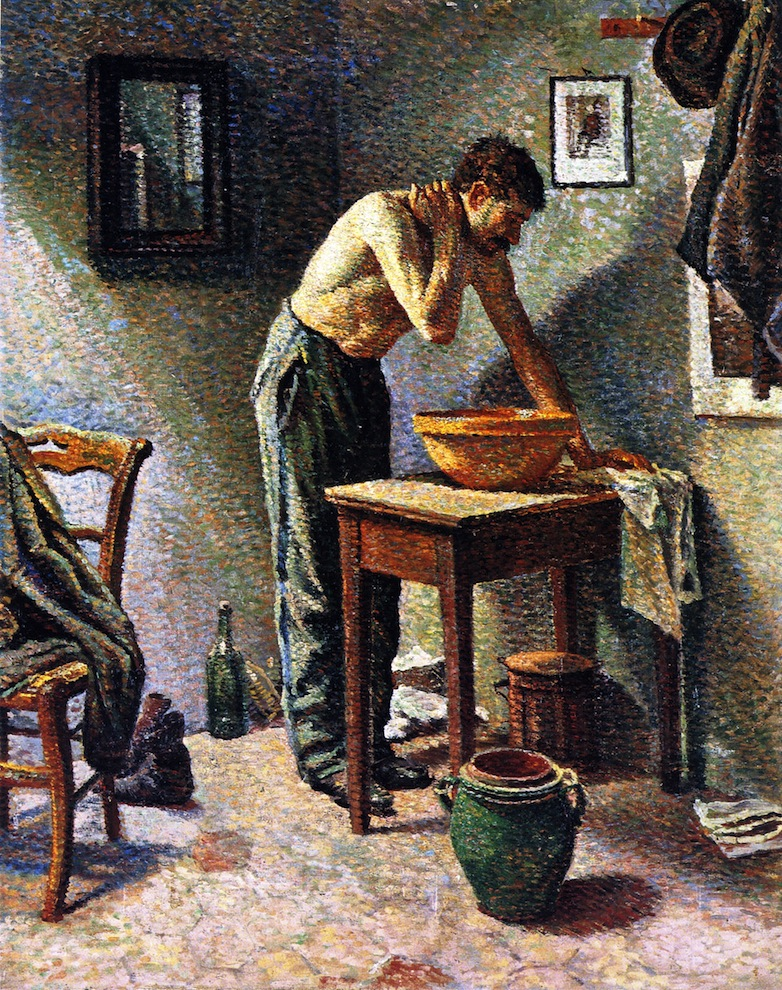
Man Washing, 1887

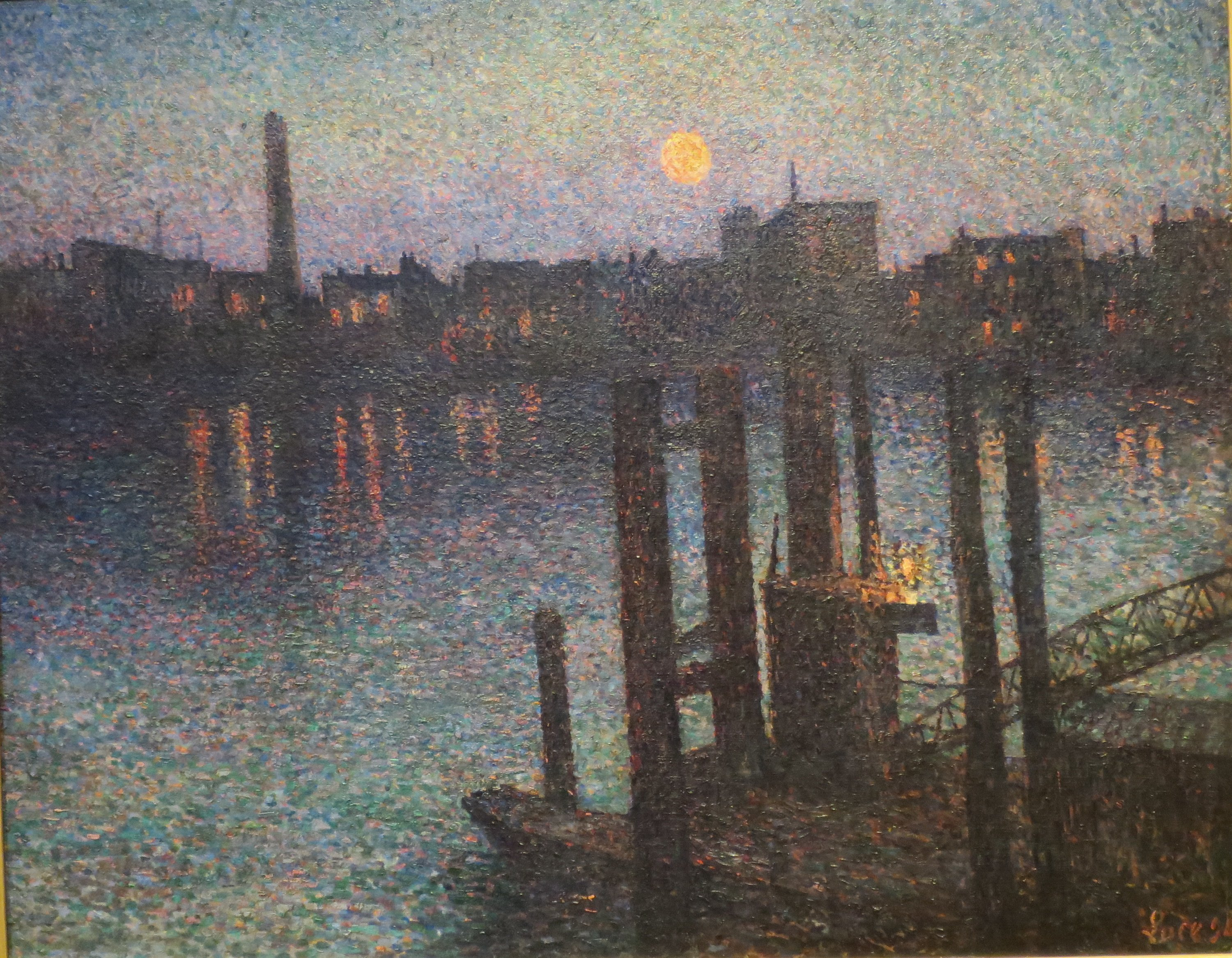
Port of London, Night High Museum of Art

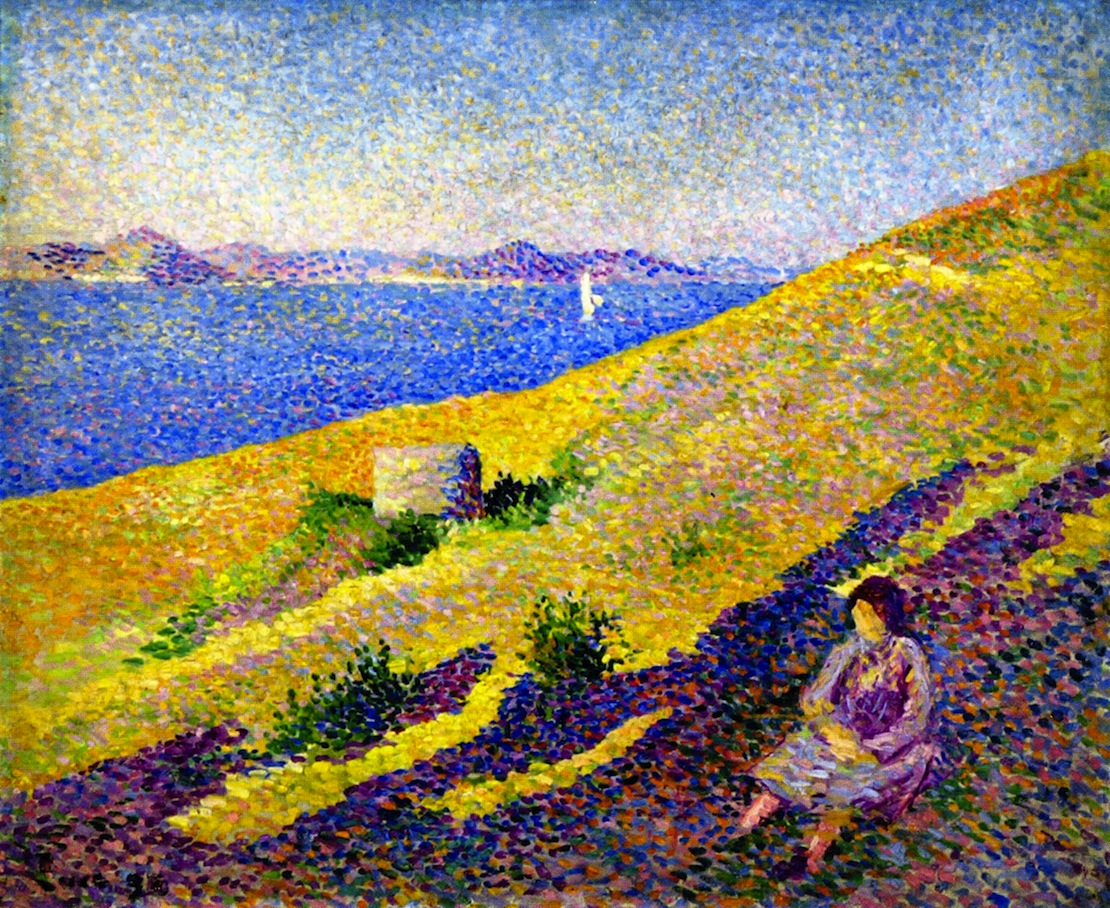
Côte de la citadelle, 1892

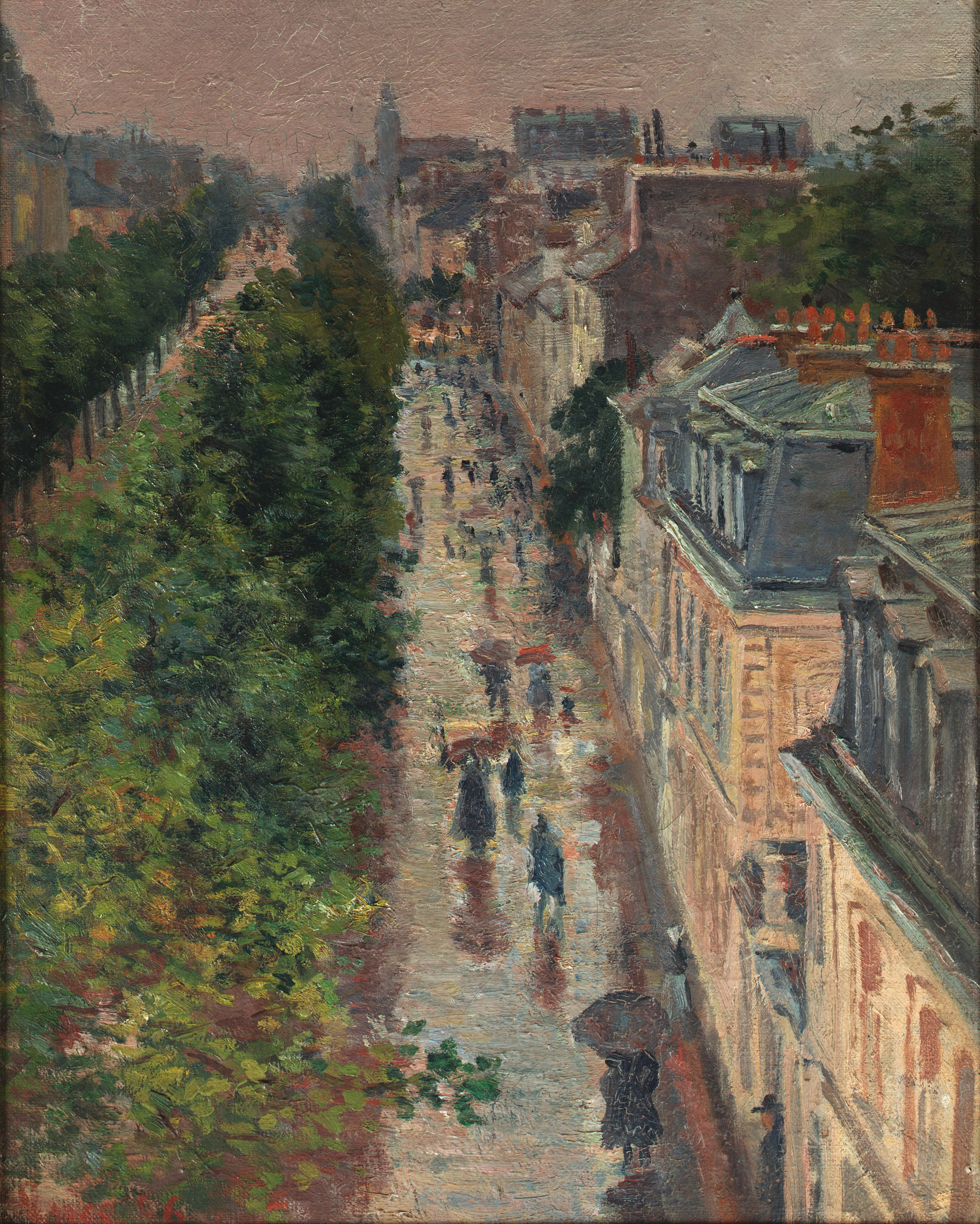
Street Scene in Paris, 1896

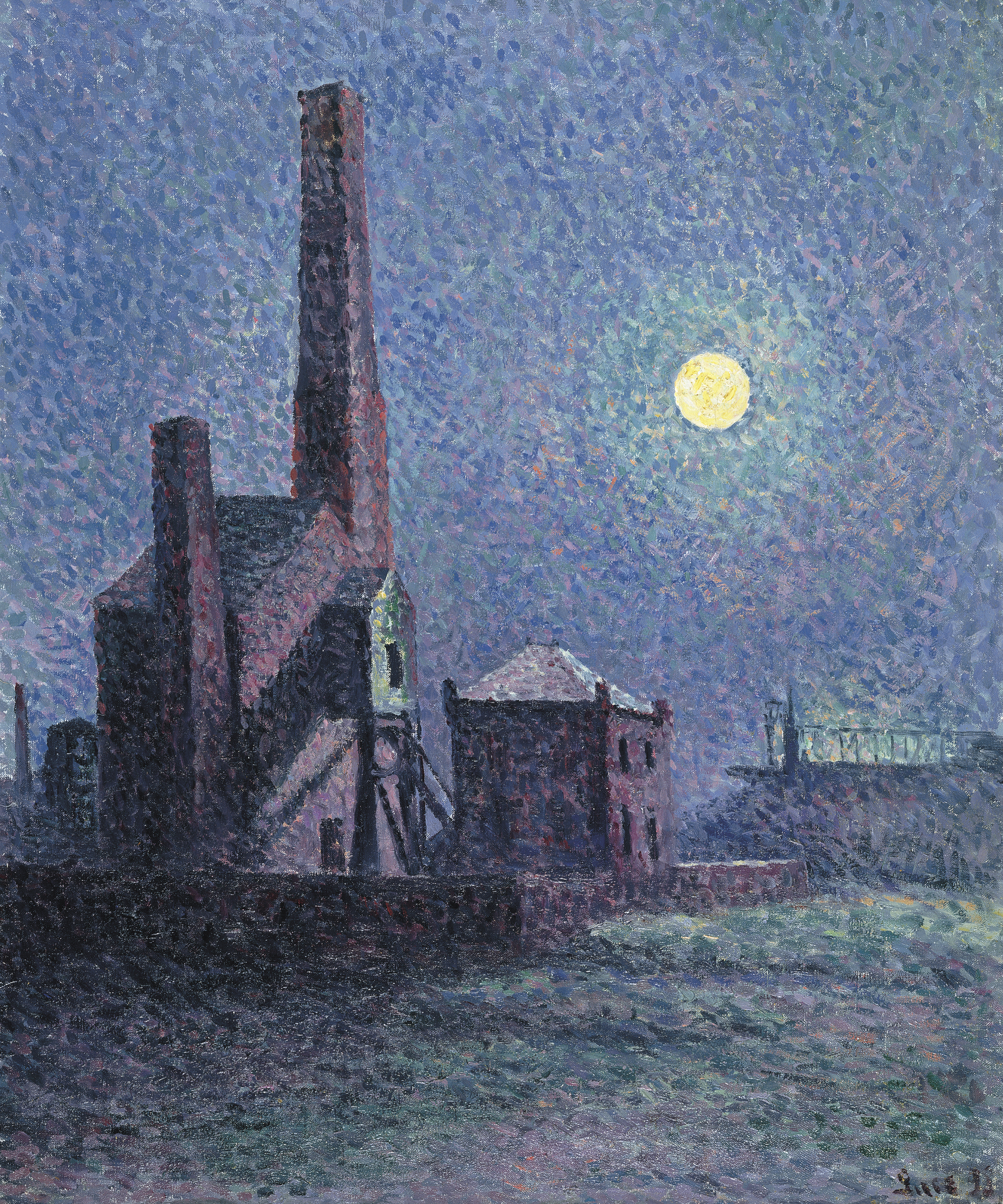
Factory in the Moonlight, 1898

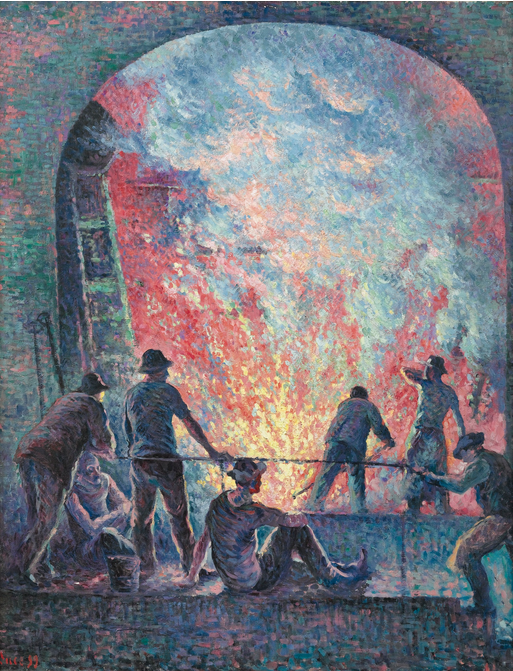
L’Aciérie, 1899

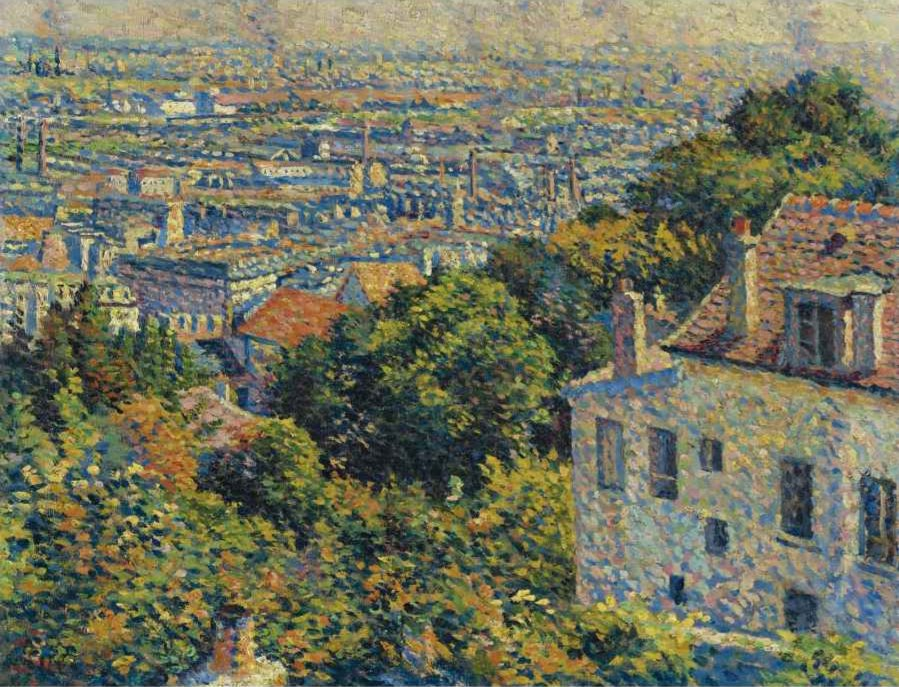
Montmartre, de la rue Cortot, vue vers Saint-Denis, c. 1900

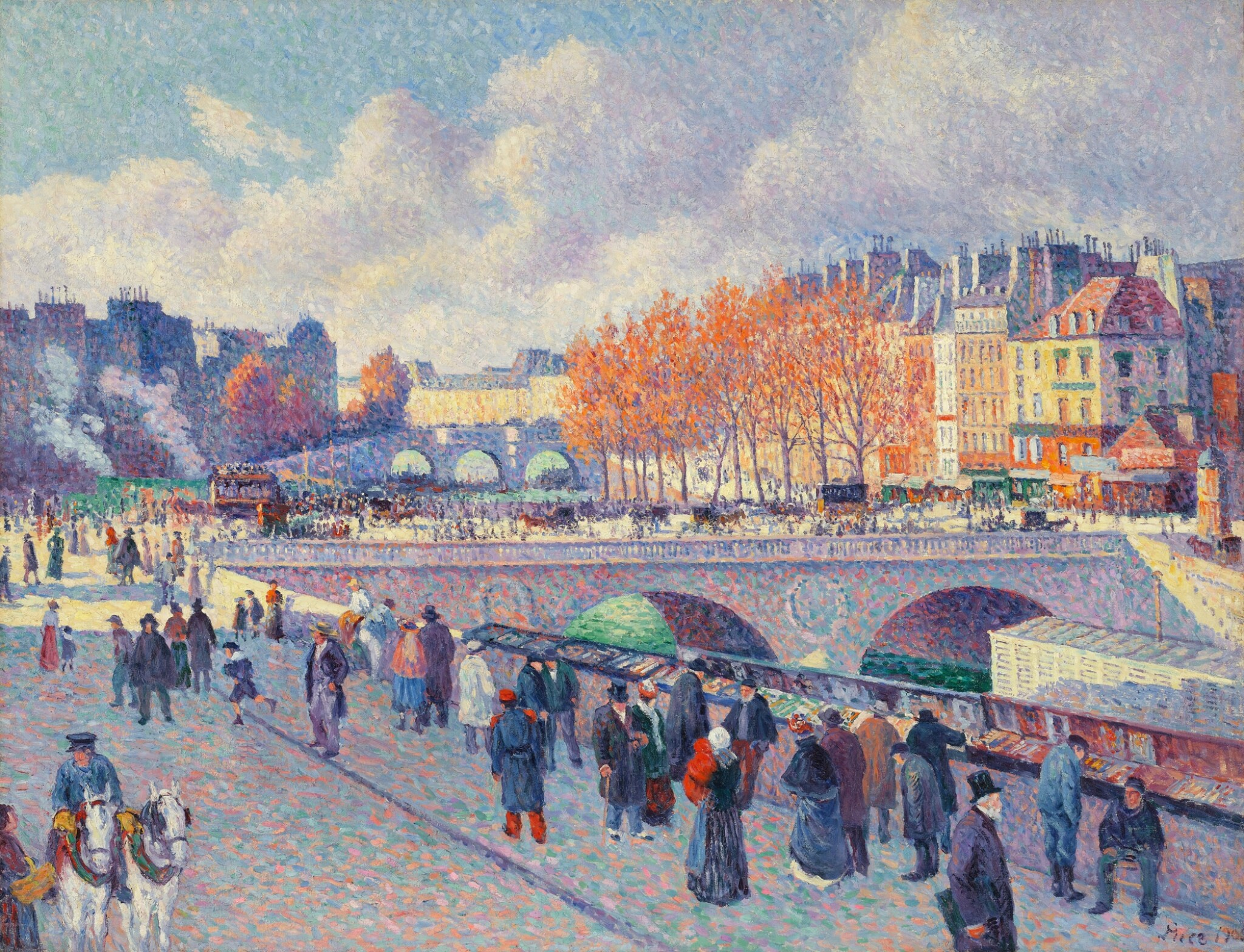
La Seine au Pont Saint-Michel, 1900

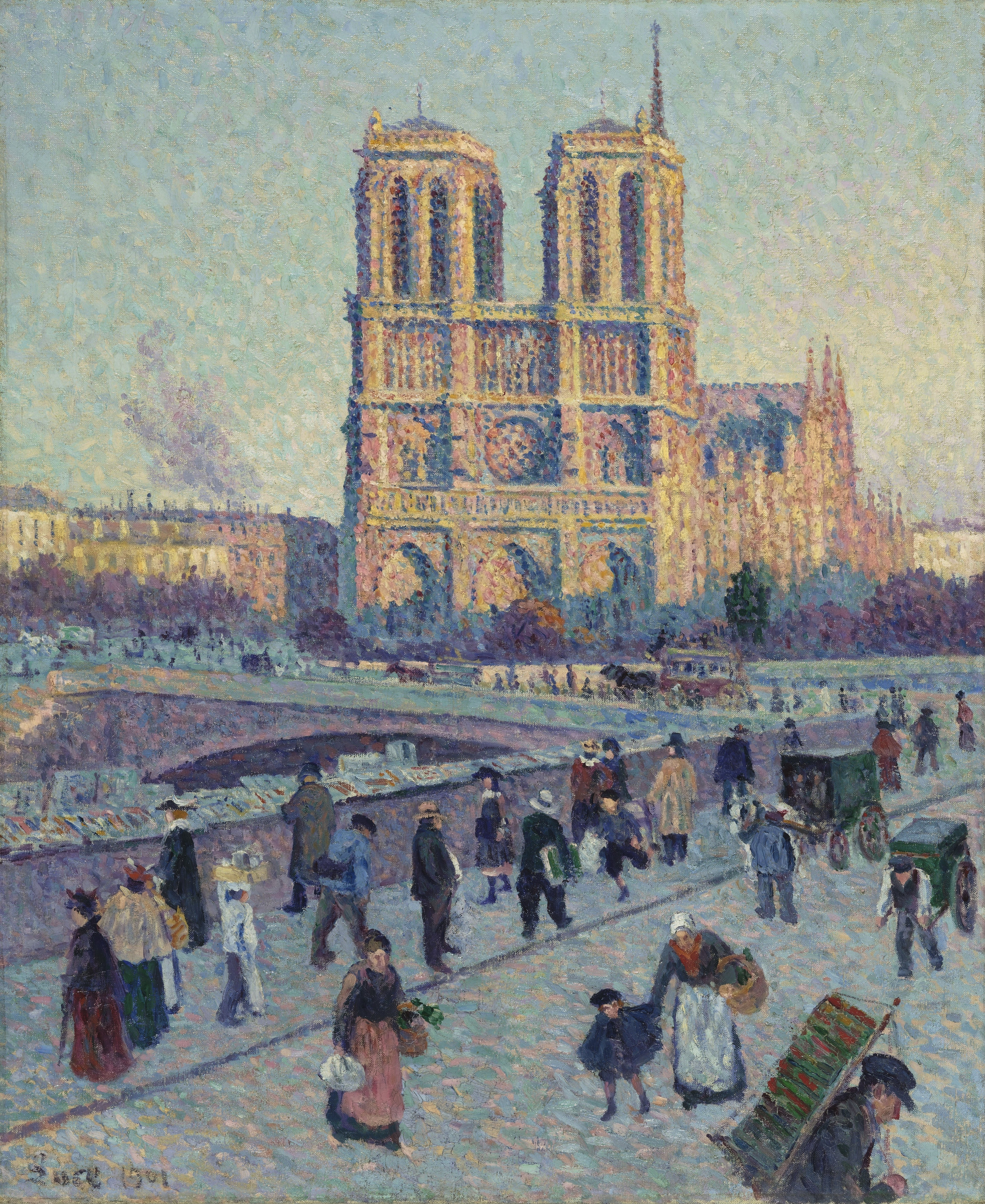
The Quai Saint-Michel and Notre-Dame, 1901

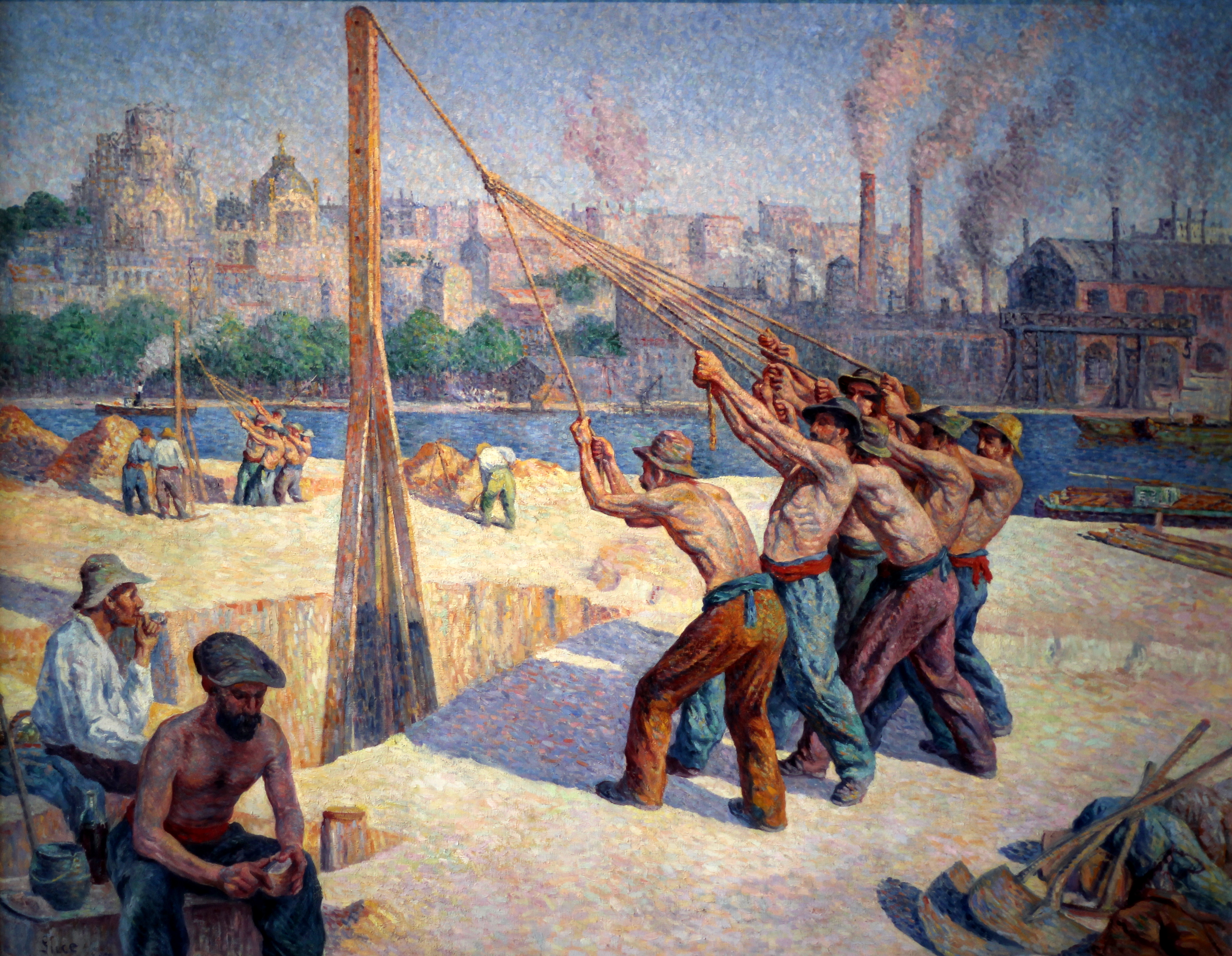
Les batteurs de pieux, 1902

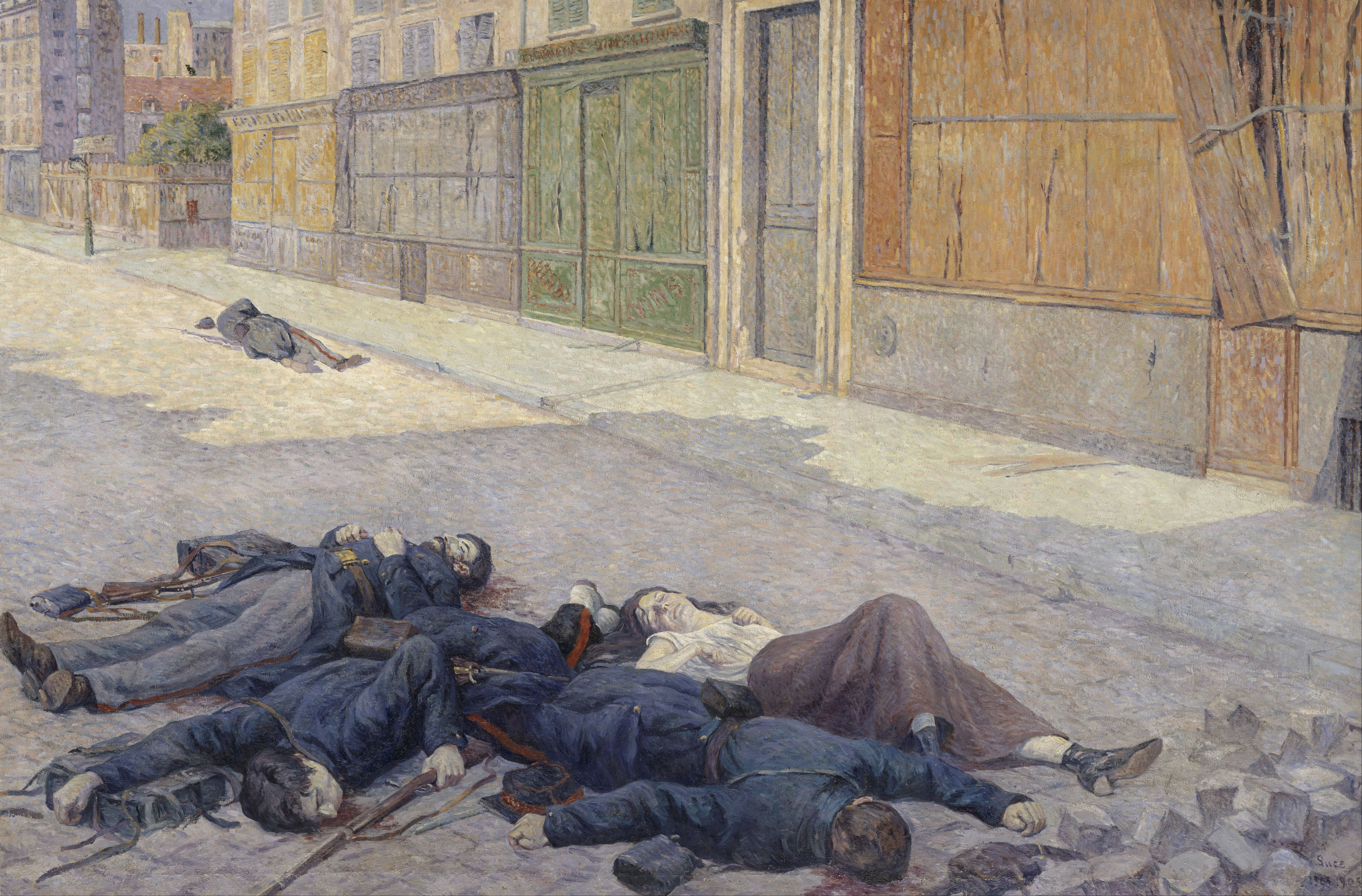
A Street in Paris in May 1871, 1903–1906

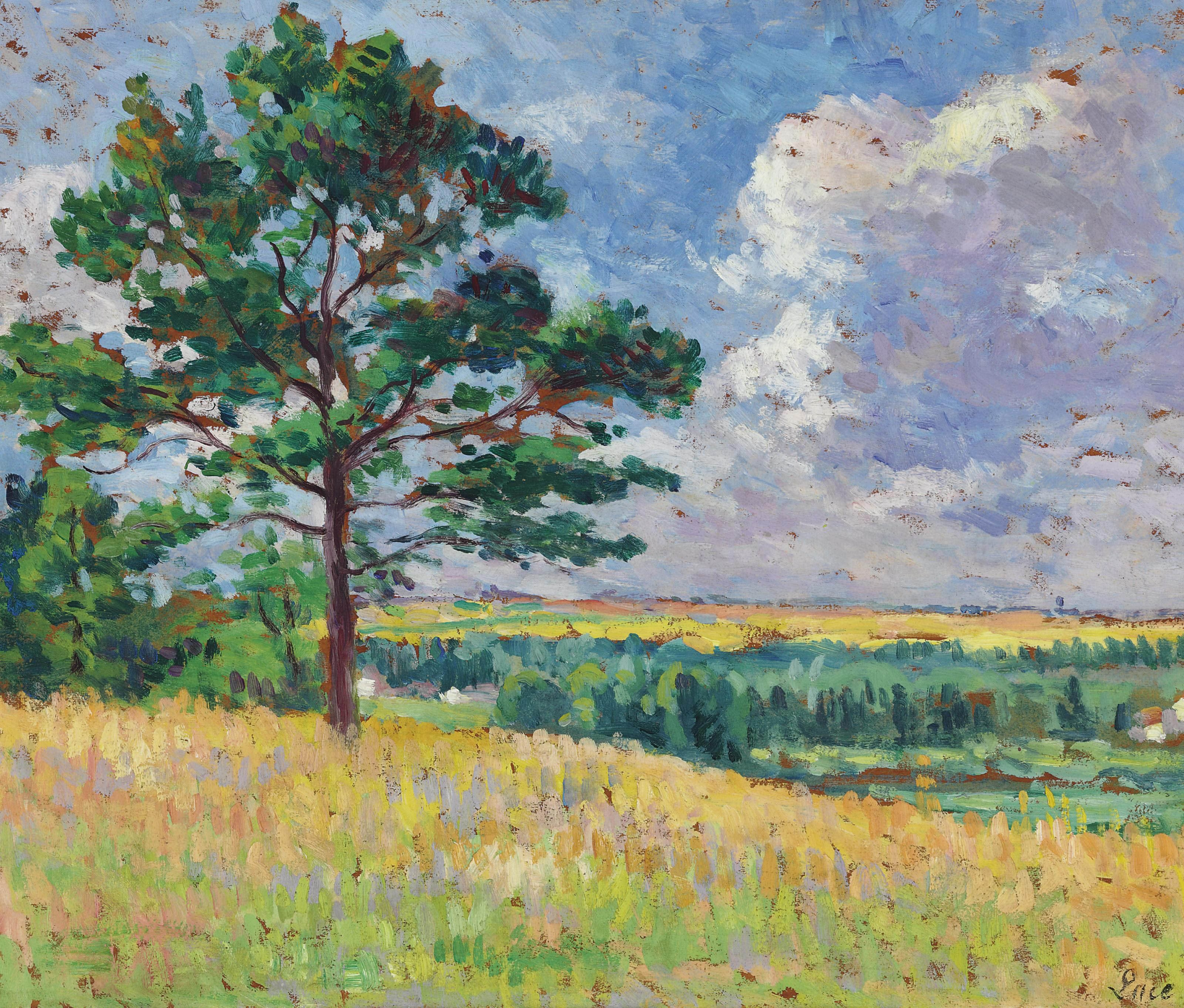
Paysage près de Méréville, c. 1905

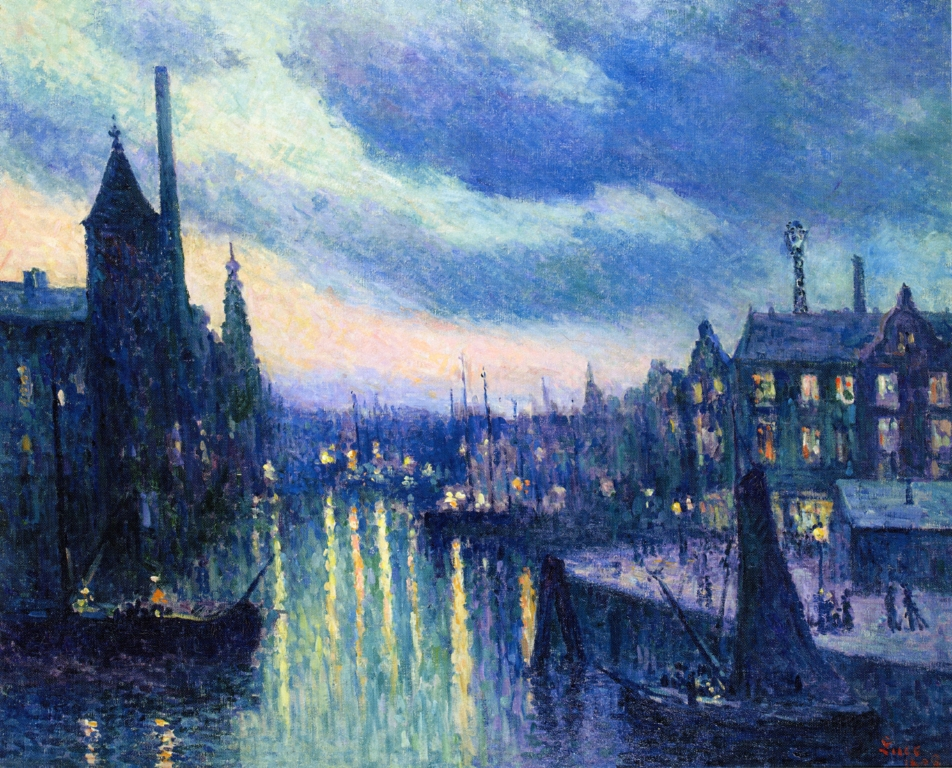
The Port of Rotterdam, Evening, 1908

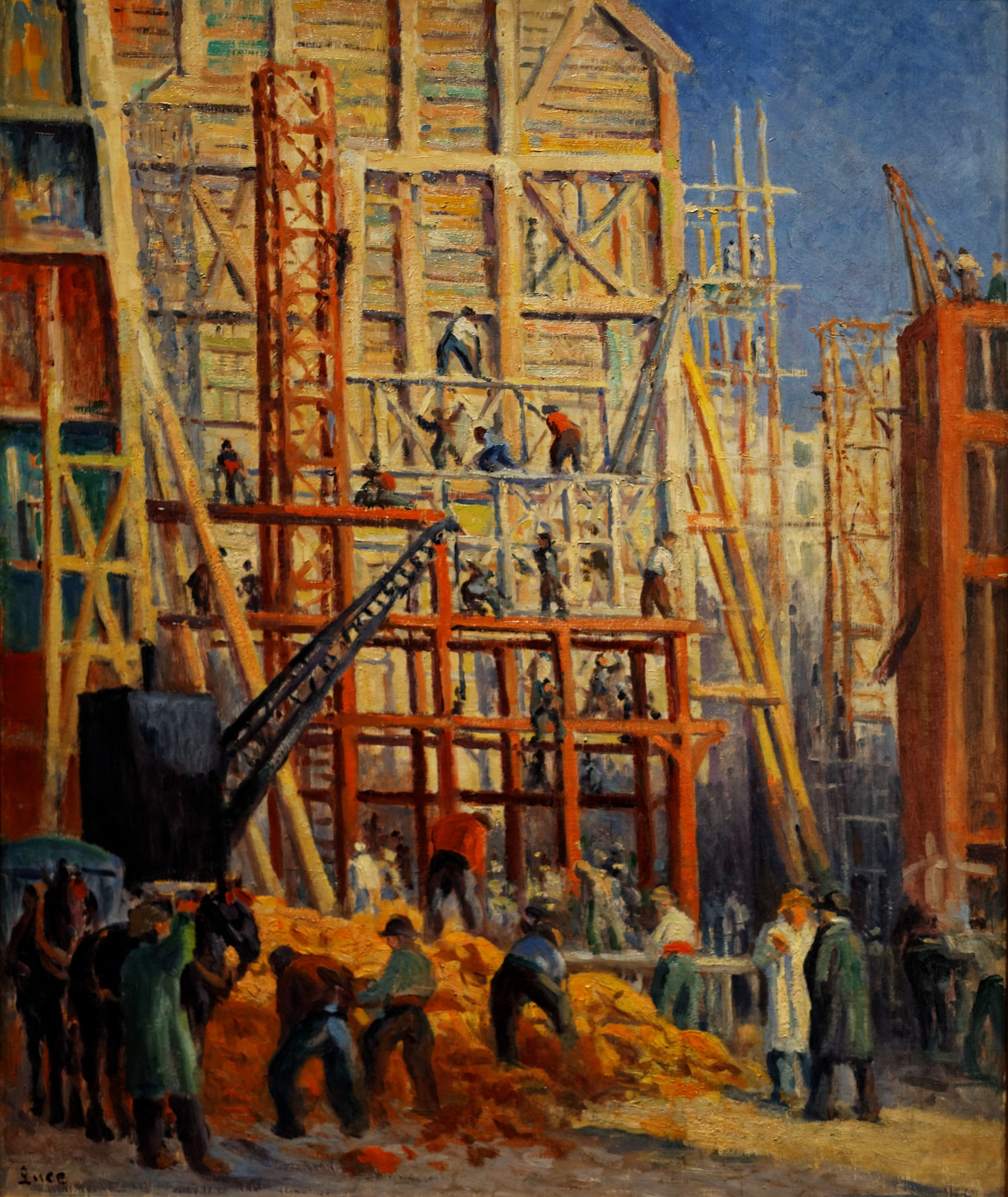
Le chantier, 1911

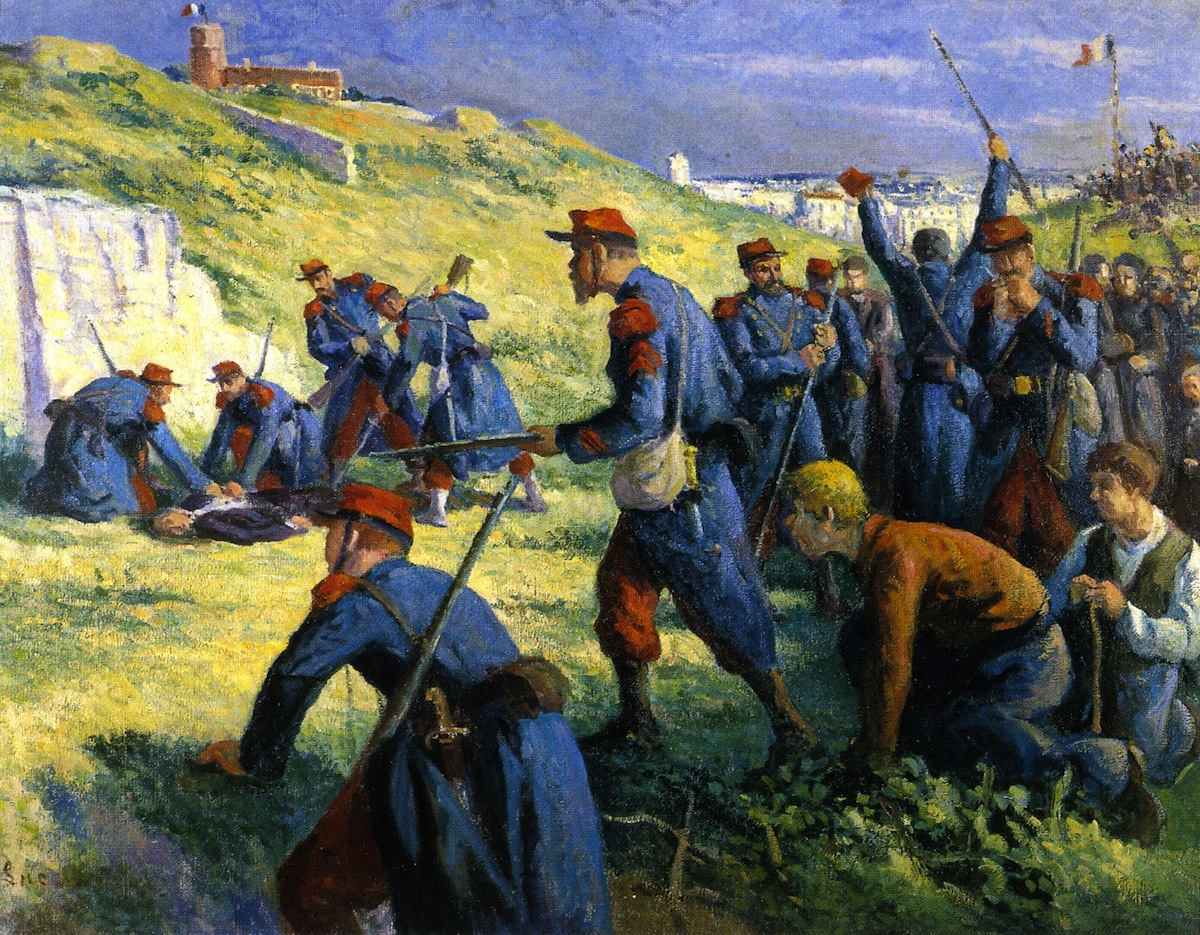
The Execution of Varlin, 1914–1917

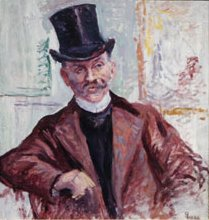
Portrait of Doctor Marieux

== Sources ==
- Clement, Russell T.; Houzé, Annick (1999). Neo-Impressionist Painters: a Sourcebook on Georges Seurat, Camille Pissarro, Paul Signac, Théo Van Rysselberghe, Henri Edmond Cross, Charles Angrand, Maximilien Luce, and Albert Dubois-Pillet. Westport, CT: Greenwood Press. ISBN 0-313-30382-7.
- Clement, Russell T. (2001). Jill Berk Jiminez, Joanna Banham (ed.). Dictionary of Artists' Models. Fitzroy Dearborn. ISBN 9781579582333.
