= Marco Sciaccaluga =

Italian actor and theatre director (1953–2021)

- Born: 21 August 1953; Genoa, Italy
- Died: 10 March 2021 (aged 67); Genoa, Italy
- Occupations: Actor; theatre director

Marco Sciaccaluga ([ˈmarko ʃʃakkaˈluːɡa]; 21 August 1953 – 10 March 2021) was an Italian actor and theatre director.

== Biography ==
Sciaccaluga studied theatre at the Teatro Nazionale di Genova in Genoa, where he graduated in 1972. He then worked at the Teatro Aperto alongside Gianni Fenzi, Franco Carli and Antonello Pischedda. In 1975 he directed Equus by Peter Shaffer. He also appeared in four films and two television series. His eldest son Carlo is an actor and theatre director too.

Marco Sciaccaluga died in Genoa on 10 March 2021 at the age of 67.

== Filmography ==
=== Cinema ===
- Lapin Lapin (1997)
- Ardena (1997)
- Guido che sfidò le Brigate Rosse (2007)
- Terror Take Away (2018)

=== Television ===
- Vita amori autocensura e morte in scena del signor di Molière nostro contemporaneo ovvero il Tartufo (1976)
- La casa nova (1976)
