= Cavalli =

Cavalli is an Italian surname, literally meaning "horses". Notable people with the surname include:

- Aldo Cavalli (born 1946), Italian bishop
- Cade Cavalli (born 1998), American baseball player
- Dick Cavalli (1923–1997), American cartoonist
- Francesco Cavalli (1602–1676), Italian 17th-century composer
- Hans Cavalli-Björkman (1928–2020), Swedish businessman
- Jean-Michel Cavalli (born 1957), French football player
- Johan Cavalli (born 1981), French footballer
- Luigi Luca Cavalli-Sforza (1922–2018), population geneticist
- Marta Cavalli (born 1998), Italian cyclist
- Olimpia Cavalli (1930–2012), Italian actress
- Roberto Cavalli (1940–2024), Italian fashion designer
- Simone Cavalli (born 1979), Italian footballer
- Valeria Cavalli (born 1959), Italian actress

== See also ==
- Cavalli, also known as Horses, a 2011 Italian film
