= Camillo Innocenti =

Italian painter

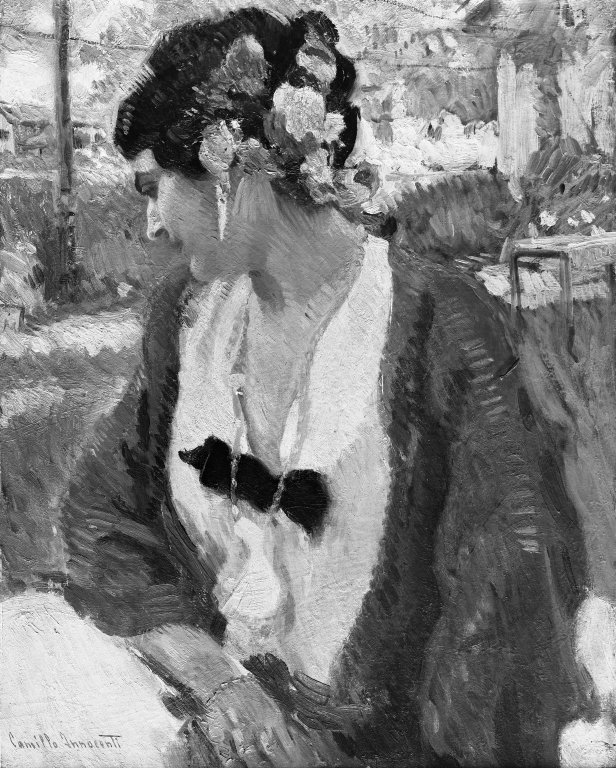
The Green Shawl (Lo scialle verde), Brooklyn Museum

Camillo Innocenti (14 June 1871 – 4 January 1961) was an Italian painter born in Rome.

== Biography ==
After he studied in Lyceum, after 1889 he joined the studios of Antonio Mancini in Rome and Domenico Morelli in Naples. After a visit to Spain in 1901, he painted local folk subjects from Abruzzo (1904) and Sardinia (1908). At the 1903 Venice Biennale, he displayed his divisionist works with an attention to social topics, alongside Giacomo Balla, Enrico Lionne, and Arturo Noci. After 1906 he began to focus on painting mainly feminine figures. He was named academic at the Academy of St Luke, and in 1912 he joined the Secessione Romana. He later traveled to Paris and Monaco.
