= Rubaldo Merello =

Italian painter and sculptor (1872–1922)

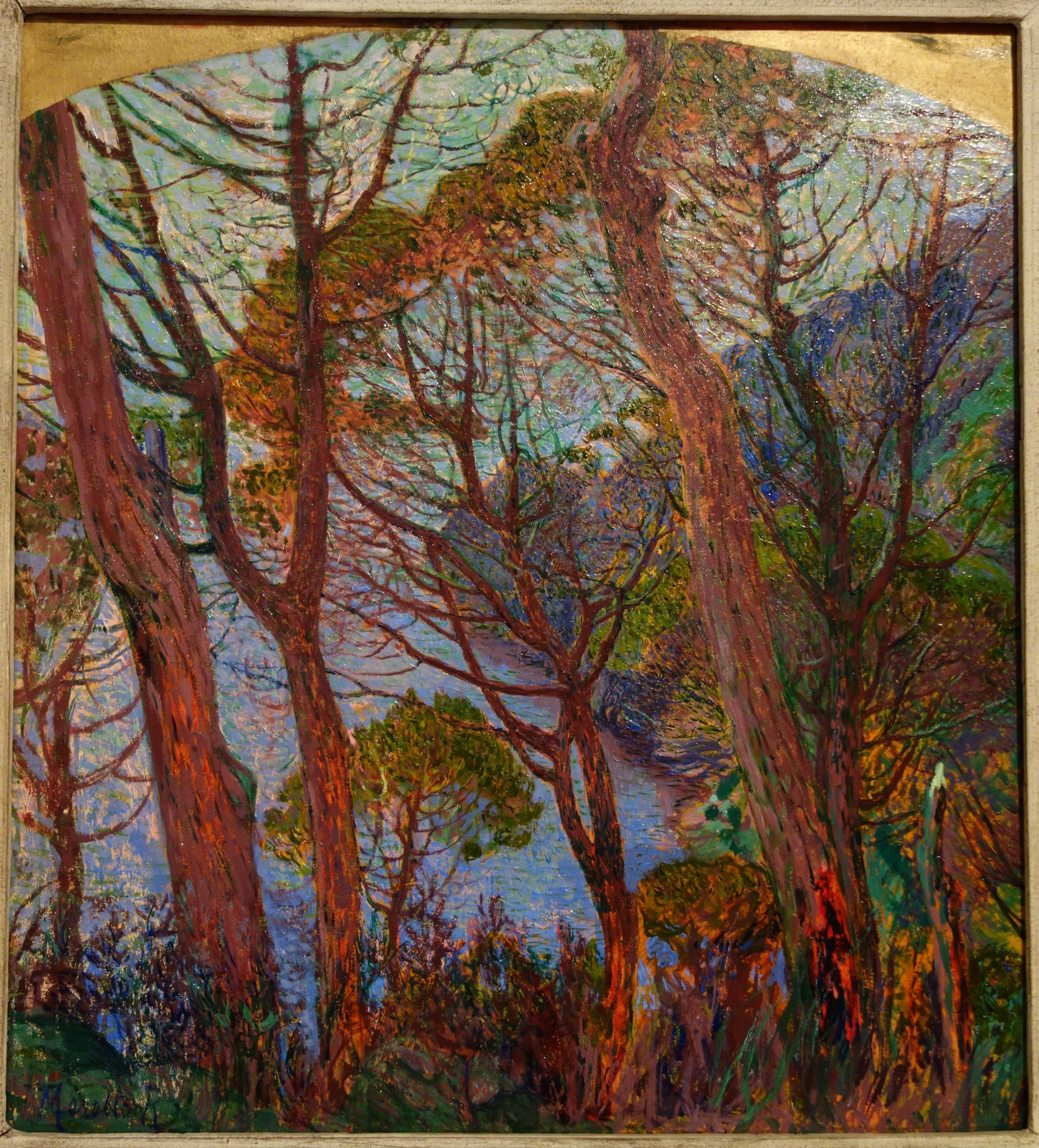
- Pines Before the Sea, 1910-1914, Accademia Ligustica di Belle Arti
- Born: 16 July 1872; Montespluga, Italy
- Died: 31 January 1922 (aged 49); Santa Margherita Ligure, Italy

Rubaldo Merello (16 July 1872 – 31 January 1922) was an Italian painter and sculptor.

== Life and career ==
Born in Montespluga, a frazione of Madesimo, Merello was the son of a customs inspector. In 1881 he moved to Genoa with his family, and there Merello trained at the Accademia Ligustica di Belle Arti, graduating in 1892. He held his first exhibition in 1894.

Following the disappointment for the rejection of one of his works by the Venice Biennale in 1895, Merello embraced a life of total isolation; in the same years he approached Divisionism, inspired by the works of Plinio Nomellini and Giuseppe Pellizza da Volpedo.

Merello held his first solo exhibition in 1909. In 1913 he became professor of painting at the Accademia Ligustica di Belle Arti. Around 1914 he moved to Portofino. In 1915 he illustrated Sem Benelli's poem Le nozze dei centauri. During World War I, he focused on sculpture.
