= Giuseppe Cominetti =

Italian painter (1882–1930)

Giuseppe Cominetti (1882–1930) was an Italian painter.

== Biography ==
He was born in Salasco, Province of Vercelli. His brother Gian Maria Cominetti (1884–1961) was a notable writer and screenwriter. He studied until 1898 in the Lyceum Massimo D'Azeglio in Turin. He received his first training at the Albertina Academy of Turin, but moved in 1902 to Genoa where he came into contact with Plinio Nomellini and the work of Theophile-Alexandre Steinlen. He was part of the Grupo dei Nove and in 1907, he exhibited I conquistatori del sole at the Promotrice of Genoa. This painting was also displayed in 1909 at the Salon d'Automne of Paris. At this time, he moved and frequented the artistic circles of the Montparnasse and Montmartre neighborhoods in Paris.

His paintings blended symbolist subjects and divisionist styles. From 1903 to 1912, he participated at the Promotrice of Genoa. In 1909, he moved to Paris, and exhibited at the Salon d’Automne and he cosigned Marinetti's Futurist Manifesto. His painting was influenced later by Fauvism and Futurism. He was influenced by the Scapigliatura painter Gaetano Previati. In 1908, he painted Matrimonio; in 1910, Lussuria; in 1913, Strada a Montmartre; in 1914, Tango; and in 1919, L’Electricité. During the first World War, in which he had ardently supported the entry of Italy, he worked as a correspondent.

Cominetti died in Rome in 1930.
