= Matteo Olivero =

Italian painter (1879–1932)

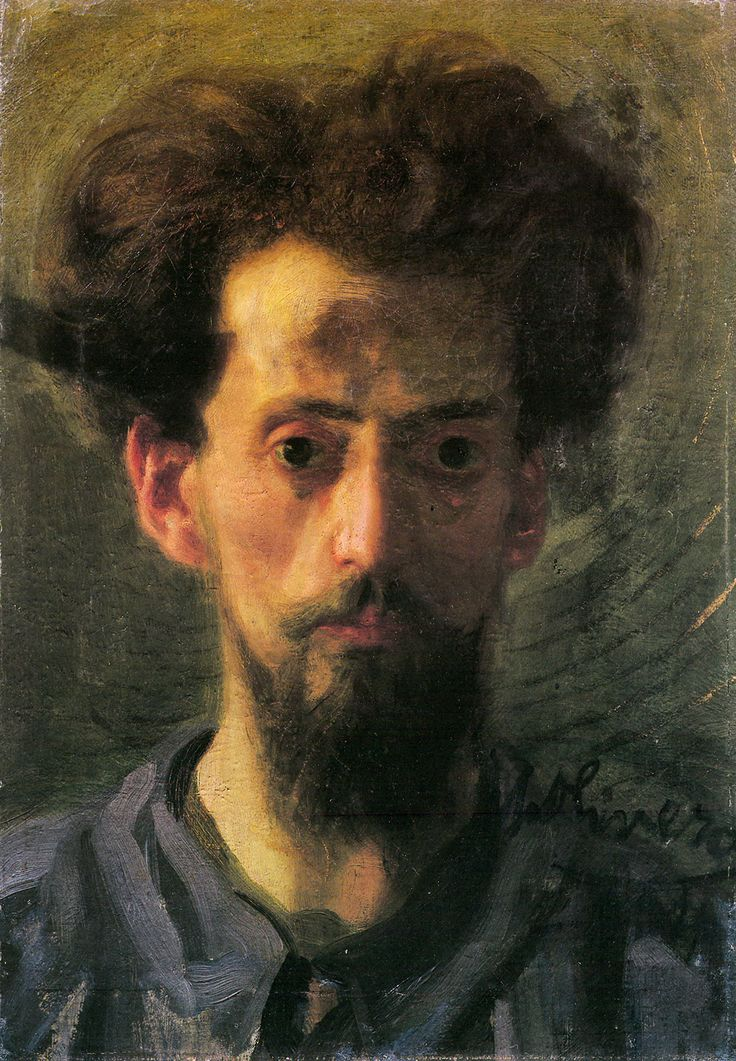
- Matteo Olivero, self-portrait, 1904.
- Born: June 15, 1879; Acceglio, Italy
- Died: April 28, 1932; Saluzzo
- Education: Accademia Albertina delle Belle Arti, Turin
- Style: Divisionist painter
- Patrons: Luigi Burgo

Matteo Pietro Olivero (15 June 1879–28 April 1932) was an Italian painter, known for his technique of reproducing sunlight reflections without physically mixing colour pigments. For that matter, he is considered a leading painter of the Italian divisionism, although he's still little-known outside the art collector's environment. In 1896 Matteo Olivero attended the Accademia Albertina delle Belle Arti in Turin. During his life, he took part in several exhibitions across Europe and started a collaboration with "Les Tendances Nouvelles", a Parisian art journal.

After a visit to a St. Moritz exhibition, he became a close friend of the painter Giuseppe Pellizza da Volpedo, with whom he started a written correspondence and, afterward, a collaboration.

Fatherless since early childhood, he was very close to his mother, Lucia Rosano. He considered her an inspiration for his paintings. His mother died on 27 March 1930 aged 86. The loss drove Olivero into a deep depression. Luigi Burgo, a local businessman and owner of a paper mill, took Olivero under his custody, hosting him in his house and becoming his patron.

A relevant collection of his works is on display at the "Pinacoteca Matteo Olivero" in Saluzzo.

== Death ==
On 28 April 1932, Olivero committed suicide by throwing himself out of a window. He was 52.

== Gallery ==
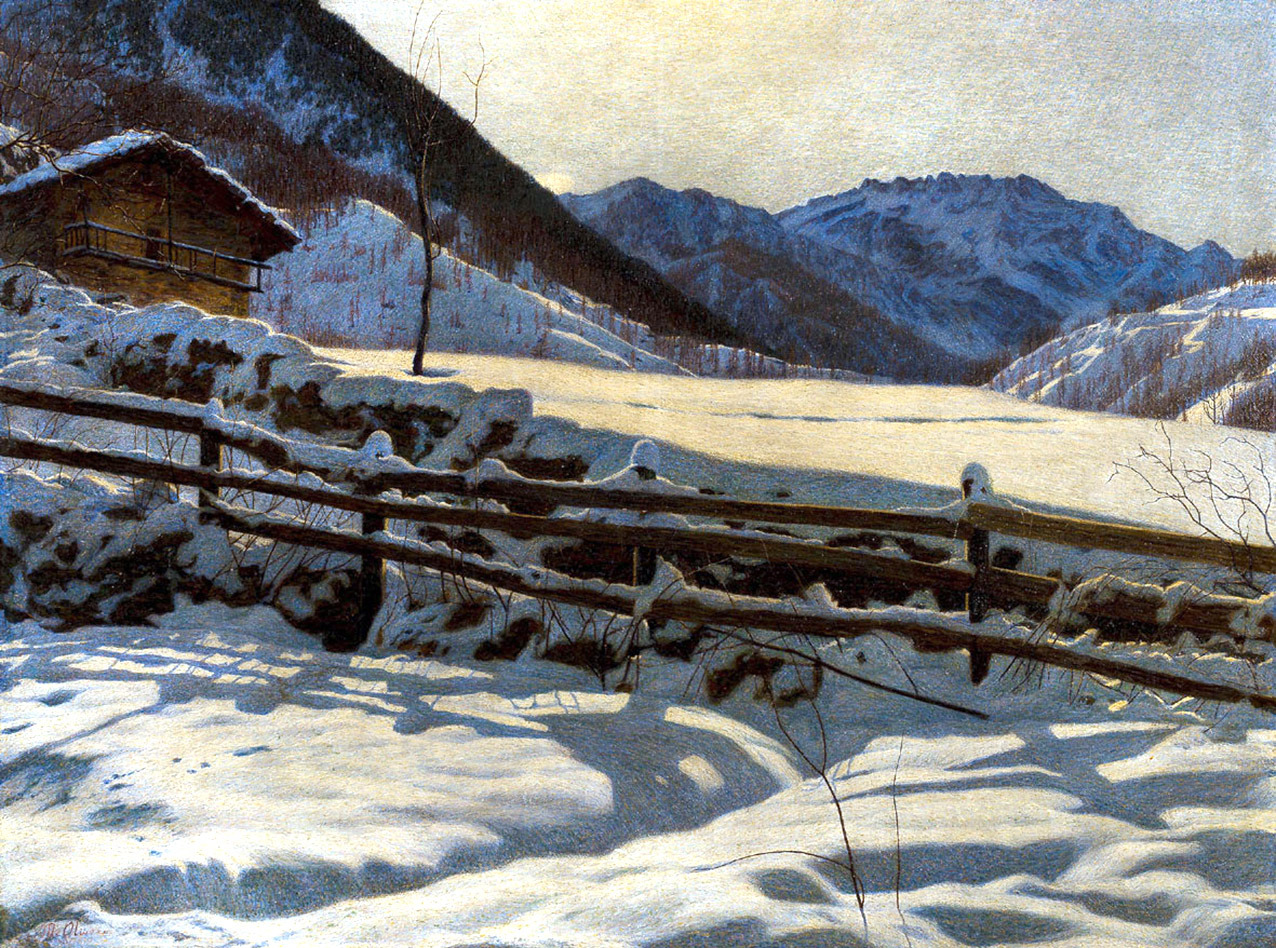

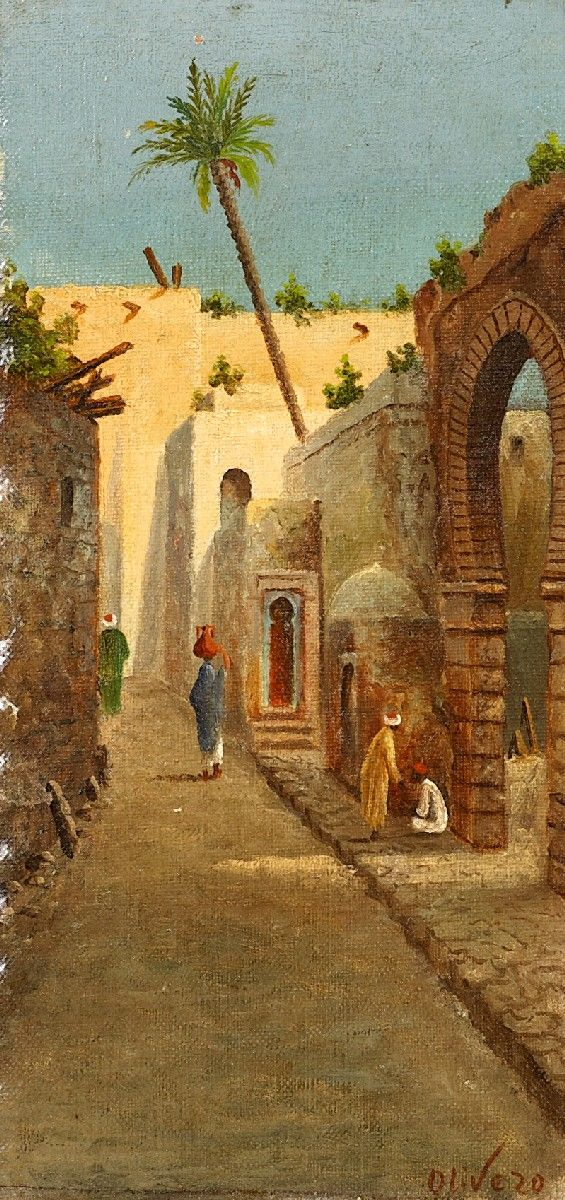
