= Henri-Edmond Cross =

French Neo-Impressionist painter (1856–1910)

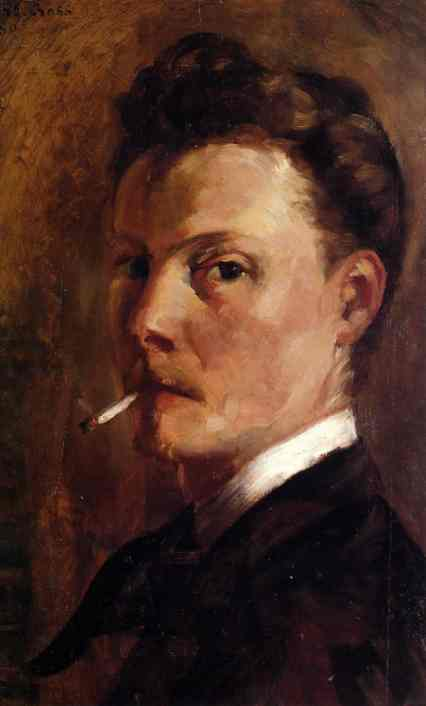
- Self-Portrait with Cigarette, 1880
- Born: Henri-Edmond-Joseph Delacroix; 20 May 1856; Douai, Nord, France
- Died: 16 May 1910 (aged 53); Saint-Clair, Var, France
- Known for: Painting
- Movement: Neo-Impressionism, Pointillism, Divisionism

Henri-Edmond Cross (French: [ɑ̃ʁi ɛdmɔ̃ kʁɔs]; 20 May 1856 – 16 May 1910), born Henri-Edmond-Joseph Delacroix ([ɑ̃ʁi ɛdmɔ̃ ʒozɛf dəlakʁwa]), was a French painter and printmaker. He is most acclaimed as a master of Neo-Impressionism and he played an important role in shaping the second phase of that movement. He was a significant influence on Henri Matisse and many other artists. His work was instrumental in the development of Fauvism.

== Background and education ==
Henri-Edmond-Joseph Delacroix was born in Douai, a commune in the Nord department in northern France, on 20 May 1856. He had no surviving siblings. His parents, with a family history of ironmongery, were Alcide Delacroix, a French adventurer, and British Fanny Woollett.

In 1865 the family moved to a location near Lille, a northern French city close to the Belgian border. Alcide's cousin, Dr. Auguste Soins, recognized Henri's artistic talent and was very supportive of his artistic inclinations, even financing the boy's first drawing instructions under painter Carolus-Duran the following year. Henri was Duran's protégé for a year. His studies continued for a short time in Paris in 1875 with François Bonvin before returning to Lille. He studied at the École des Beaux-Arts, and in 1878 he enrolled at the Écoles Académiques de Dessin et d'Architecture, studying for three years in the studio of Alphonse Colas. His art education continued, under fellow Douai artist Émile Dupont-Zipcy, after moving to Paris in 1881.

== Early work ==
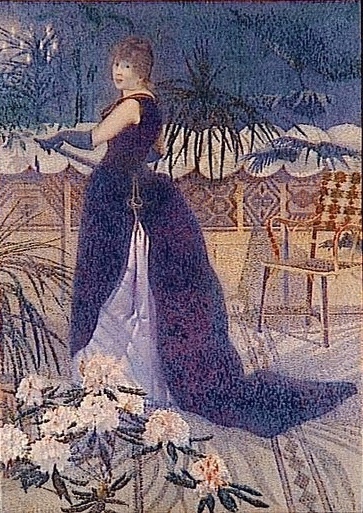
Madame Hector France, 1891, Musée d'Orsay

Cross's early works, portraits and still lifes, were in the dark colors of Realism. In order to distinguish himself from the famous Romantic painter Eugène Delacroix, he changed his name in 1881, shortening and Anglicizing his birth name to "Henri Cross" – the French word croix means cross. 1881 was also the year of his first exhibition at the Salon des Artistes Français. He painted many landscapes on an 1883 trip to the Alpes-Maritimes, accompanied by his family. Dr. Soins, who was also along on the trip, was the subject of a painting that Cross exhibited at Nice's Exposition Universelle later in the year. During the Mediterranean trip, Cross met Paul Signac, who became a close friend and artistic influence.

In 1884 Cross co-founded the Société des Artistes Indépendants, which consisted of artists displeased with the practices of the official Salon, and presented unjuried exhibitions without prizes. There, he met and became friends with many artists involved in the Neo-Impressionist movement, including Georges Seurat, Albert Dubois-Pillet, and Charles Angrand. Despite his association with the Neo-Impressionists, Cross did not adopt their style for many years. His work continued to manifest influences such as Jules Bastien-Lepage and Édouard Manet, as well as the Impressionists. The change from his early, somber, Realist work was gradual. His color palette became lighter, working in the brighter colors of Impressionism. He also worked en plein air. In the latter part of the 1880s, he painted pure landscapes that showed the influence of Claude Monet and Camille Pissarro. In about 1886, again attempting to differentiate himself from another French artist – this time, Henri Cros – he again changed his name, finally adopting "Henri-Edmond Cross".

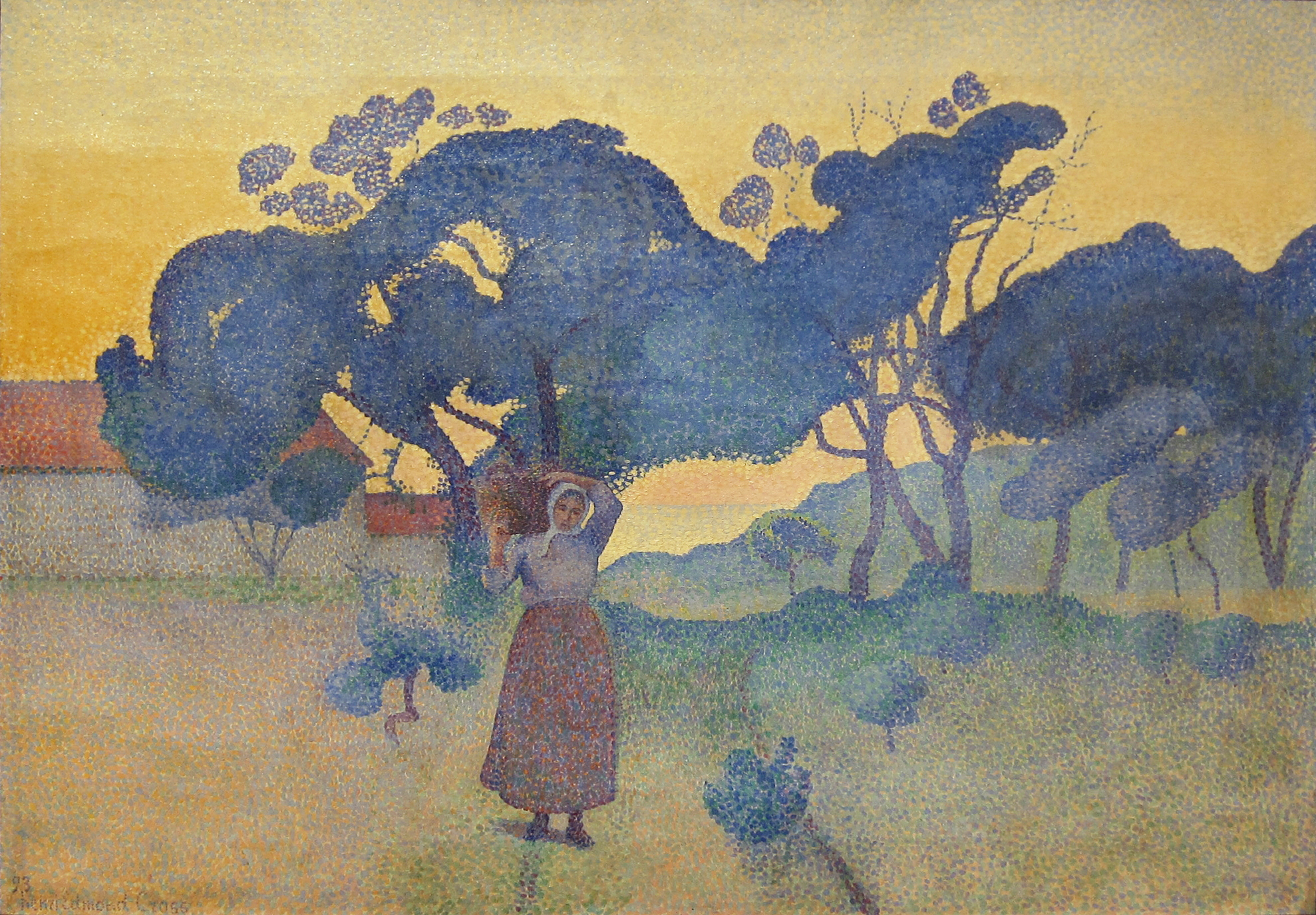
The farm, evening, 1893, private collection

In 1891 Cross began painting in the Neo-Impressionist style, and exhibited his first large piece using this technique in an Indépendants show. That painting was a divisionist portrait of Madame Hector France, née Irma Clare, whom Cross had met in 1888 and would marry in 1893. Robert Rosenblum wrote that "the picture is softly charged with a granular, atmospheric glow".

Cross had wintered in the south of France from 1883 onward, until, suffering from rheumatism, he finally moved there full-time in 1891. His works were still exhibited in Paris. His first residence in southern France was in Cabasson, near Le Lavandou, then he settled a short distance away, in the small hamlet of Saint-Clair, where he spent the remainder of his life, leaving only for trips to Italy in 1903 and 1908, and for his annual Indépendants exhibits in Paris. In 1892 Cross's friend Paul Signac moved to nearby Saint-Tropez, where they frequently hosted gatherings in Cross's garden, attended by artists including Henri Matisse, André Derain, and Albert Marquet.

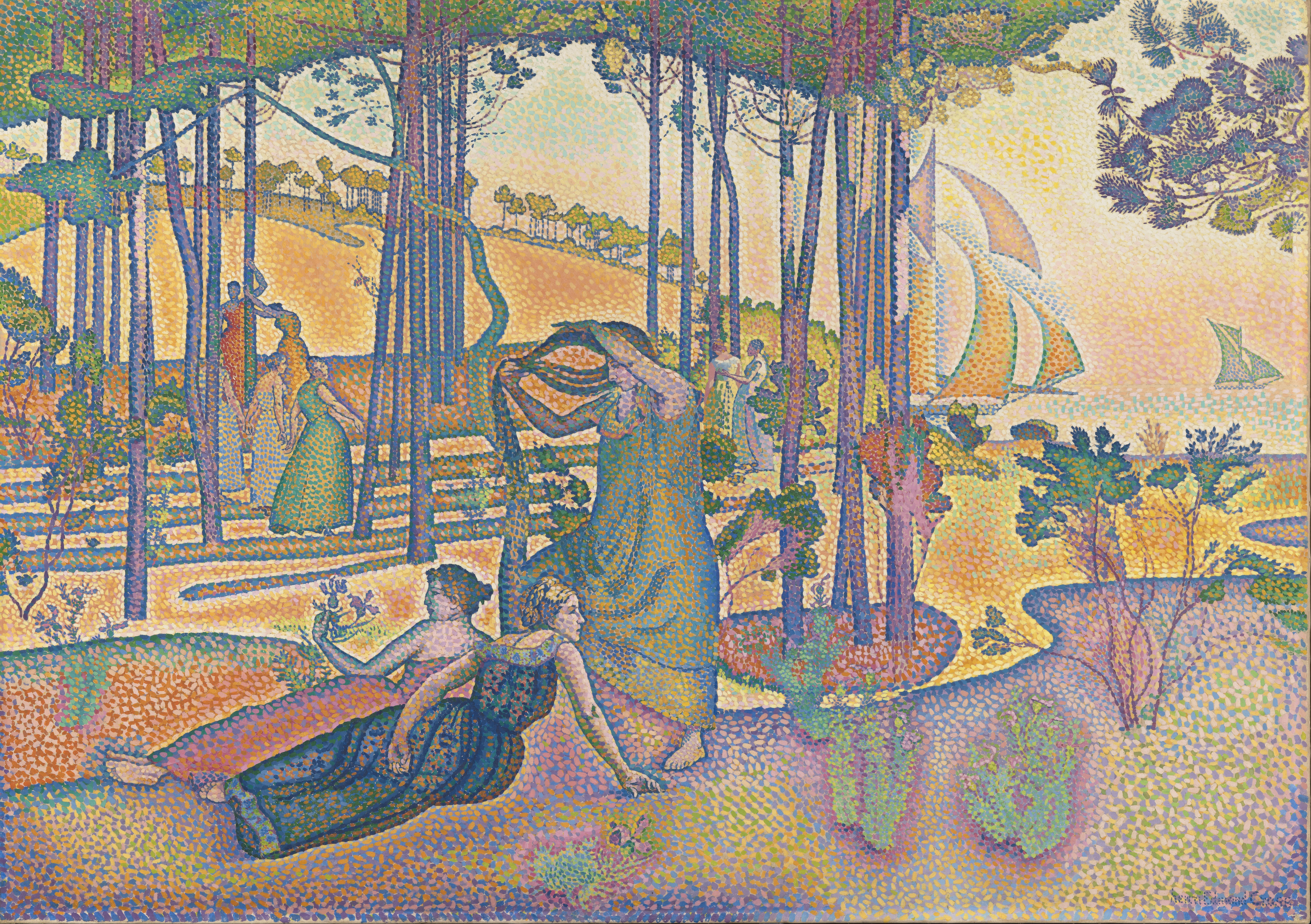
L'air du soir, c. 1893, Musée d'Orsay

Cross's affinity with the Neo-Impressionist movement extended beyond the painting style to include their political philosophies. Like Signac, Pissarro, and other Neo-Impressionists, Cross believed in anarchist principles, with hope for a utopian society. In 1896 Cross created a lithograph, L'Errant (The Wanderer). This marked the first time he had worked with a publisher, and the piece was featured anonymously in Les Temps Nouveaux, Jean Grave's anarchist journal. Cross's anarchist sentiments influenced his choice of subjects: he painted scenes illustrating a utopian world that could exist through anarchism.

The process of creating Divisionist paintings with numerous small dots of color was tedious and time-consuming. When Cross wanted to depict quick impressions, he created watercolor or colored pencil images in his sketchbooks. He wrote of a rustic French outing:

"Oh! What I saw in a split second while riding my bike tonight! I just had to jot down these fleeting things ... a rapid notation in watercolor and pencil: an informal daubing of contrasting colors, tones, and hues, all packed with information to make a lovely watercolor the next day in the quiet leisure of the studio."

== Later years ==
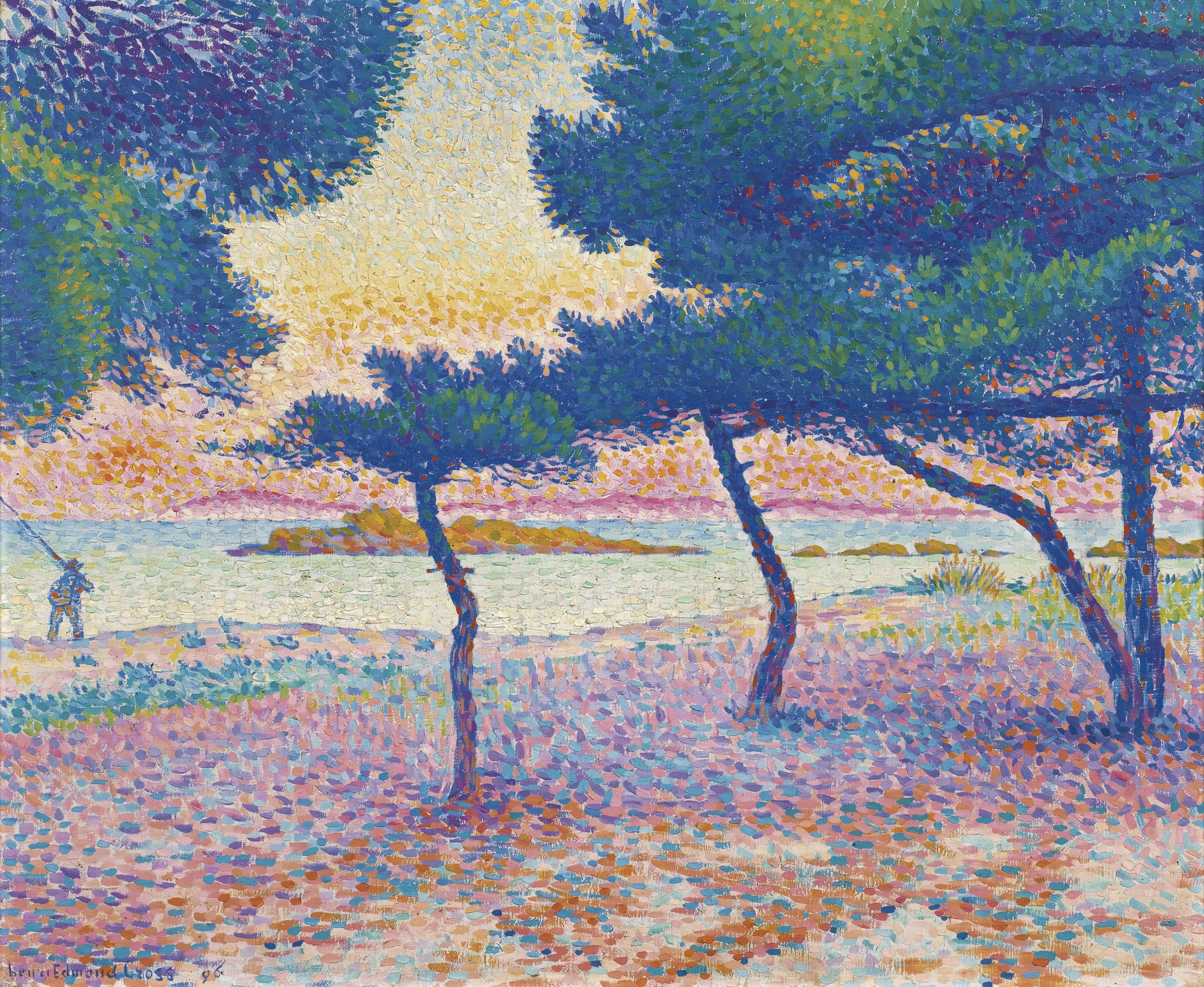
La Plage de Saint-Clair, 1896

Cross's paintings of the early- to mid-1890s are characteristically Pointillist, with closely and regularly positioned tiny dots of color. Beginning around 1895, he gradually shifted his technique, instead using broad, blocky brushstrokes and leaving small areas of exposed bare canvas between the strokes. The resulting surfaces resembled mosaics, and the paintings may be seen as precursors to Fauvism and Cubism. In the Pointillist style, minute spots of paint were used to blend colors harmoniously; in contrast, the strategy in "second generation Neo-Impressionism" was to keep the colors separate, resulting in "vibrant shimmering visual effects through contrast". Cross stated that the Neo-Impressionists were "far more interested in creating harmonies of pure color, than in harmonizing the colors of a particular landscape or natural scene". Matisse and other artists were very influenced by the late-career Cross, and such works were instrumental in forming the principles of Fauvism. Among the other artists influenced by Cross were André Derain, Henri Manguin, Charles Camoin, Albert Marquet, Jean Puy, and Louis Valtat.

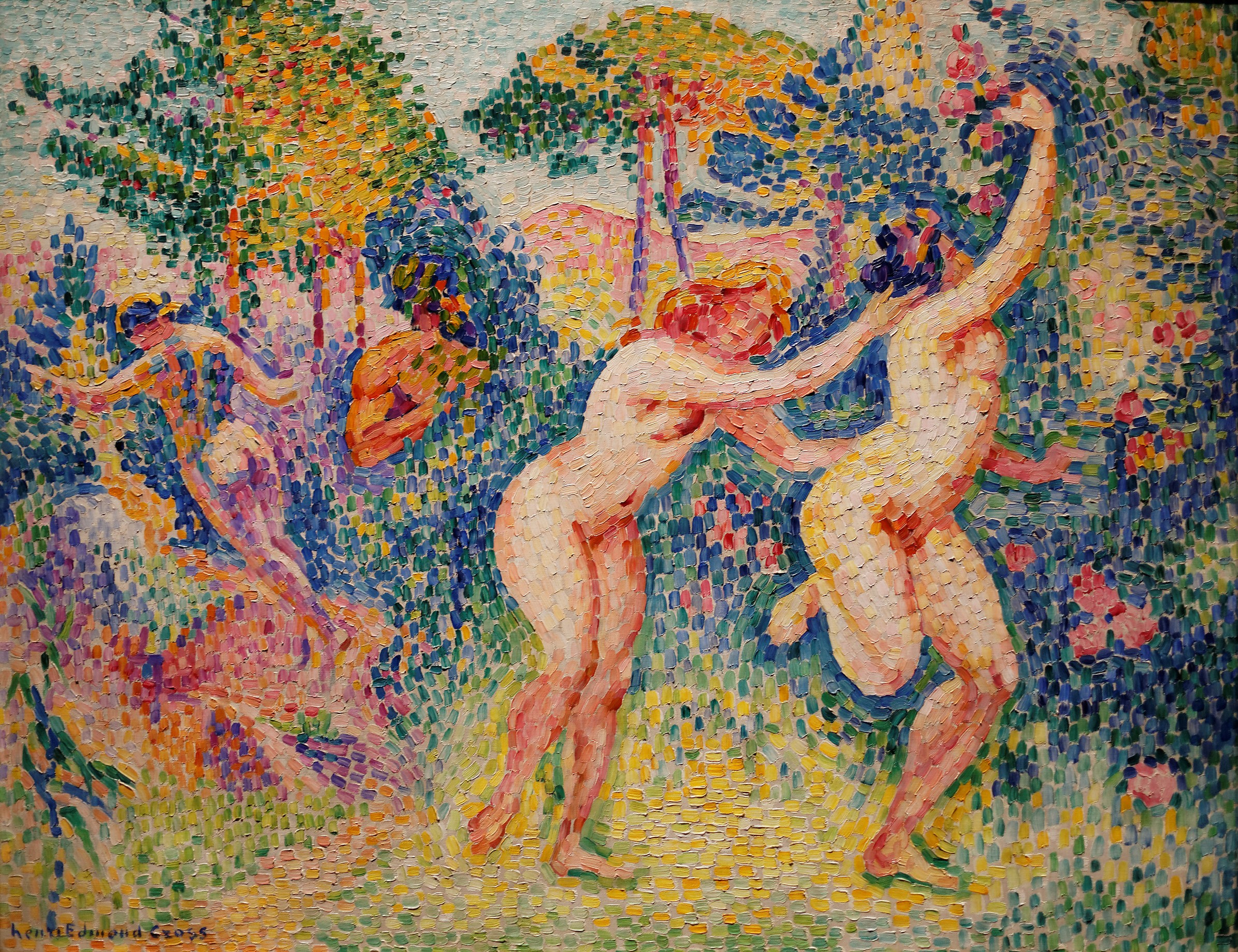
La fuite des nymphes, c. 1906, Musée d'Orsay

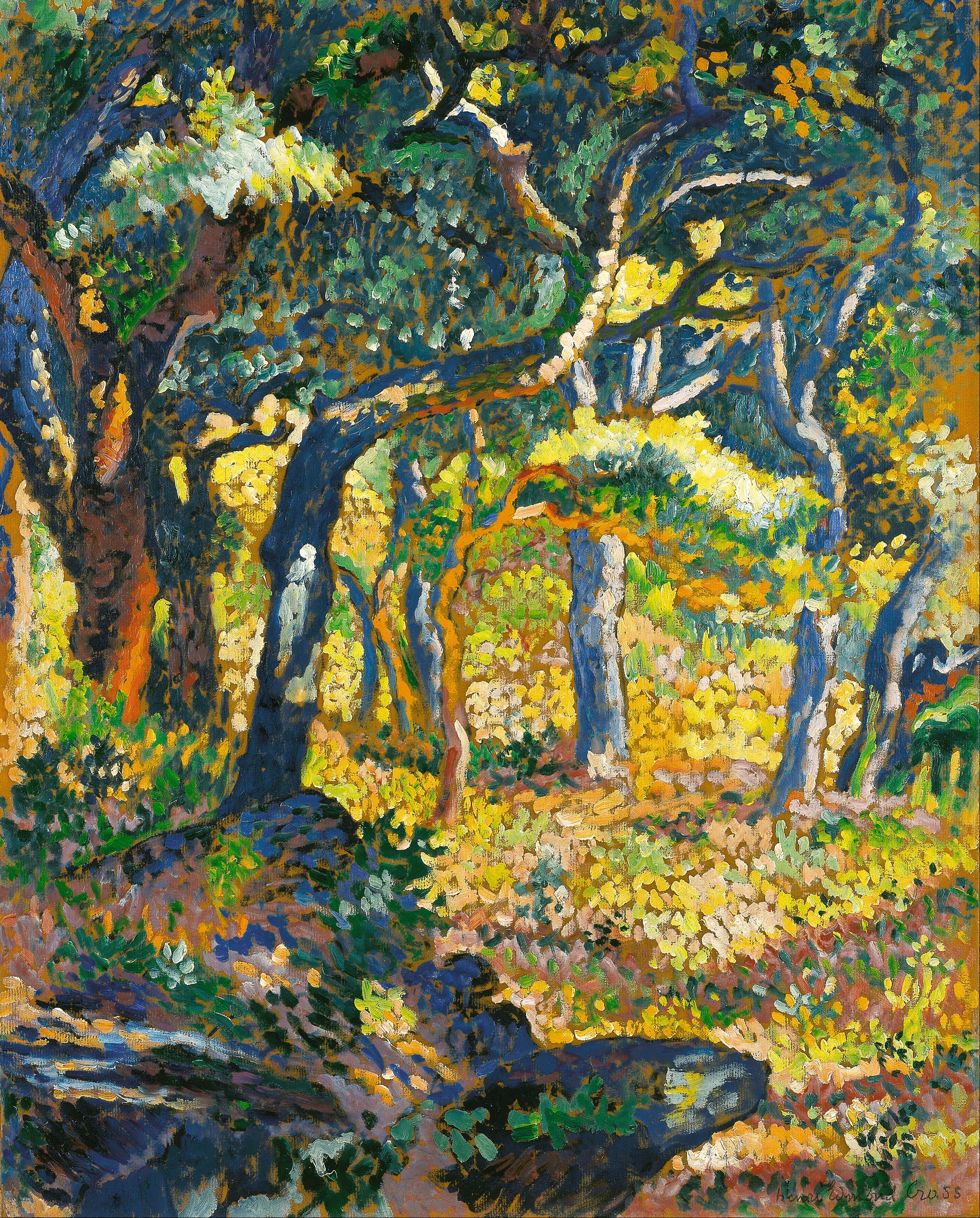
Une clairière en Provence (Étude), c. 1906

In 1905 Galerie Druet in Paris mounted Cross's first solo exhibition, which featured thirty paintings and thirty watercolors. The show was very successful, receiving critical acclaim, and most of the works were sold. Belgian Symbolist poet Emile Verhaeren, an avid supporter of Neo-Impressionism in his country, provided the preface for the exhibition catalog, writing:

"These landscapes ... are not merely pages of sheer beauty, but motifs embodying a lyrical sense of emotion. Their rich harmonies are satisfying to the painter’s eye, and their sumptuous, luxuriant vision is a poet's delight. Yet this abundance never tips into excess. Everything is light and charming ..."

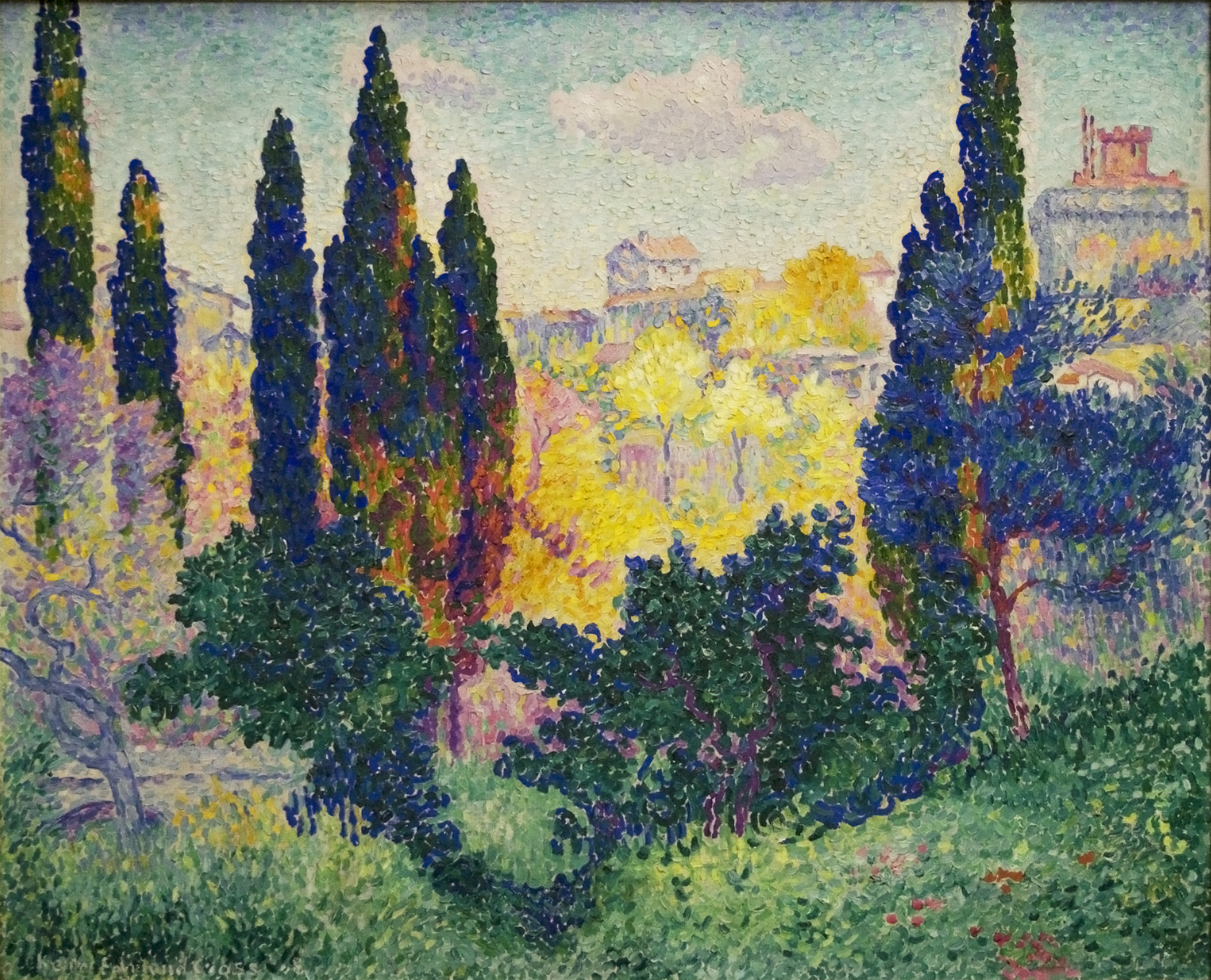
Cypresses at Cagnes, 1908, Musée d'Orsay

In the early 1880s Cross began to experience trouble with his eyes, which grew more severe in the 1900s. He also increasingly suffered from arthritis. At least in part due to these health issues that plagued him for years, Cross's body of work is relatively small. However, in his last years he was productive and very creative, and his work was featured in significant solo exhibitions; he received great acclaim from critics and enjoyed commercial success.

In 1909 Cross was treated in a Paris hospital for cancer. In January 1910 he returned to Saint-Clair, where he died of the cancer just four days short of his 54th birthday, on 16 May 1910. His tomb, in the Le Lavandou cemetery, features a bronze medallion designed by his friend, Théo van Rysselberghe. In July 1911, the city of Cross's birth, Douai, mounted a retrospective exhibition of his work.

== Selected exhibitions ==
In addition to the exhibitions mentioned above, Cross participated in many others. Octave Maus invited him to exhibit his work in several of the Annual Exhibitions of Les XX. Cross participated in the Libre Esthétique show of 1895 at Maus's invitation, and also in those of 1897, 1901, 1904, 1908, and 1909. In 1898 he participated with Paul Signac, Maximilien Luce, and Théo van Rysselberghe in the first Neo-Impressionist exhibition in Germany, organized by Harry Kessler at Keller und Reiner Gallery (Berlin). In 1907 Félix Fénéon assembled a Cross retrospective in Paris at Galerie Bernheim-Jeune, with Maurice Denis contributing the catalogue preface. Other venues with Cross exhibitions included Samuel Bing's L'Art Nouveau à Paris, Galerie Durand-Ruel (Paris), Cassirer Gallery (Hamburg, Berlin), Toison d'or exhibition (Moscow), Bernheim-Jeune's Aquarelle et pastel, and various others, including galleries in Paris, Dresden, Weimar, and Munich.

== Gallery ==
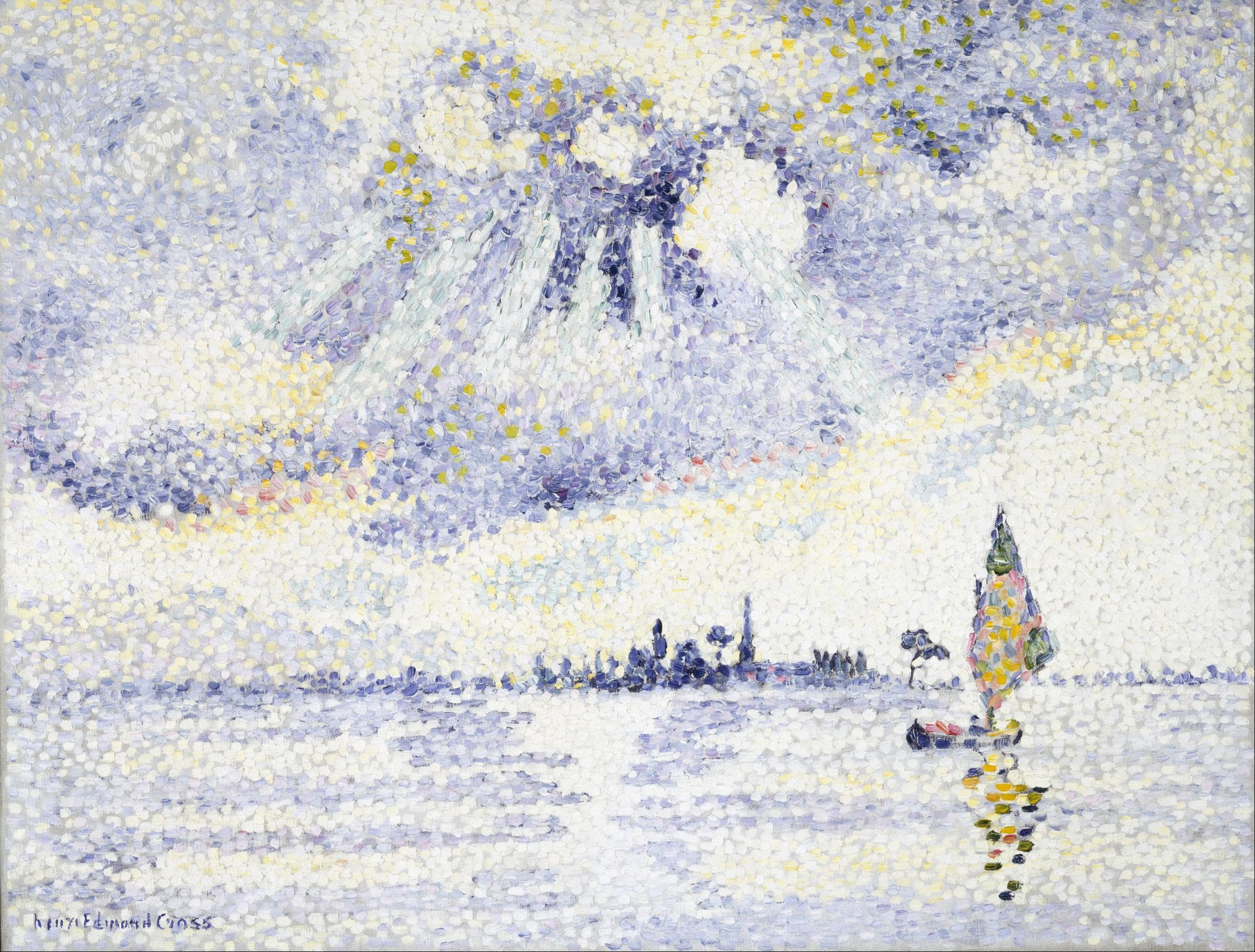
Sunset on the Lagoon, Venice 1898–1893

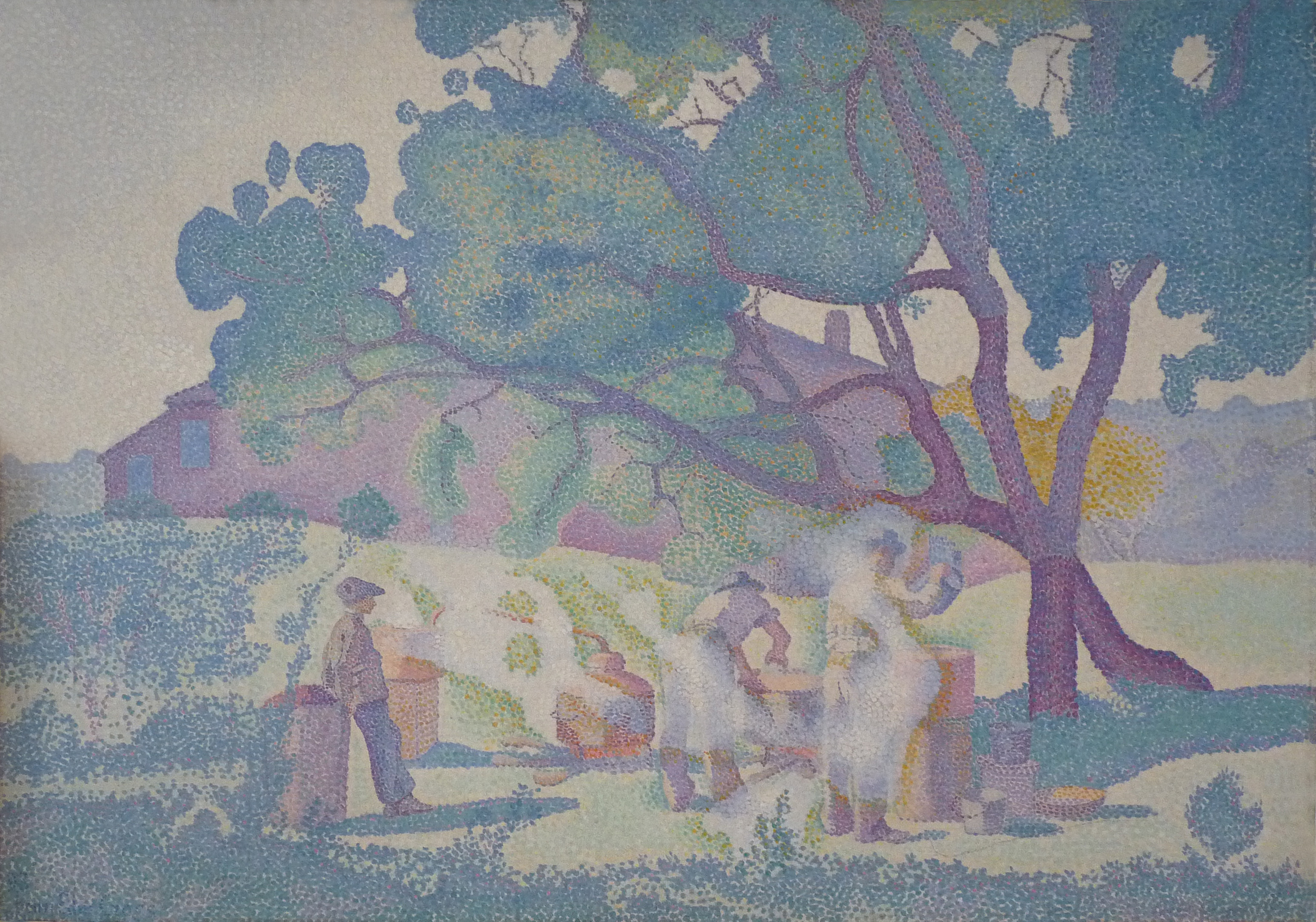
La Ferme, matin, 1893

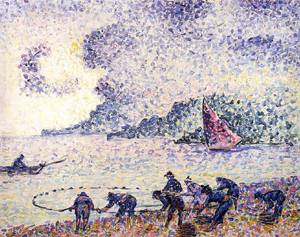
Fisherman, 1895

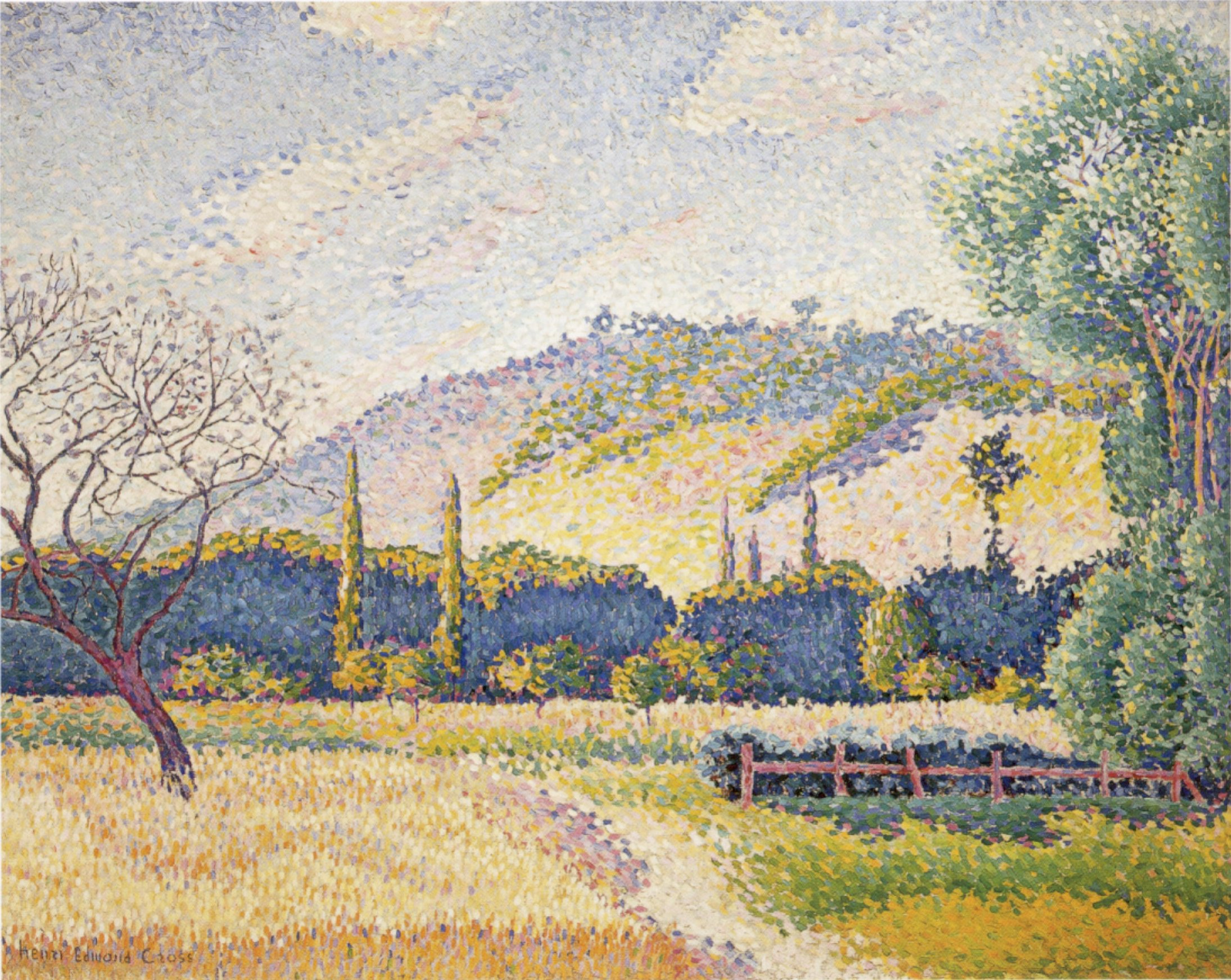
Landscape, c. 1896–1899

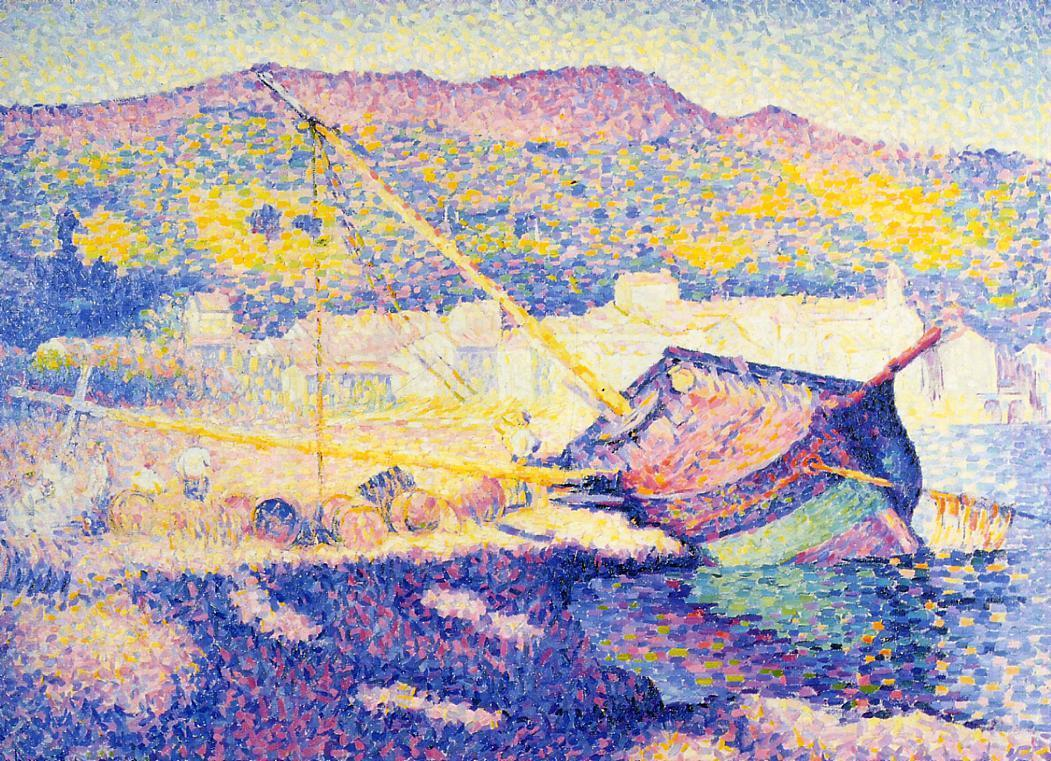
La barque bleue, 1899

Portrait of Mrs. Cross, 1901

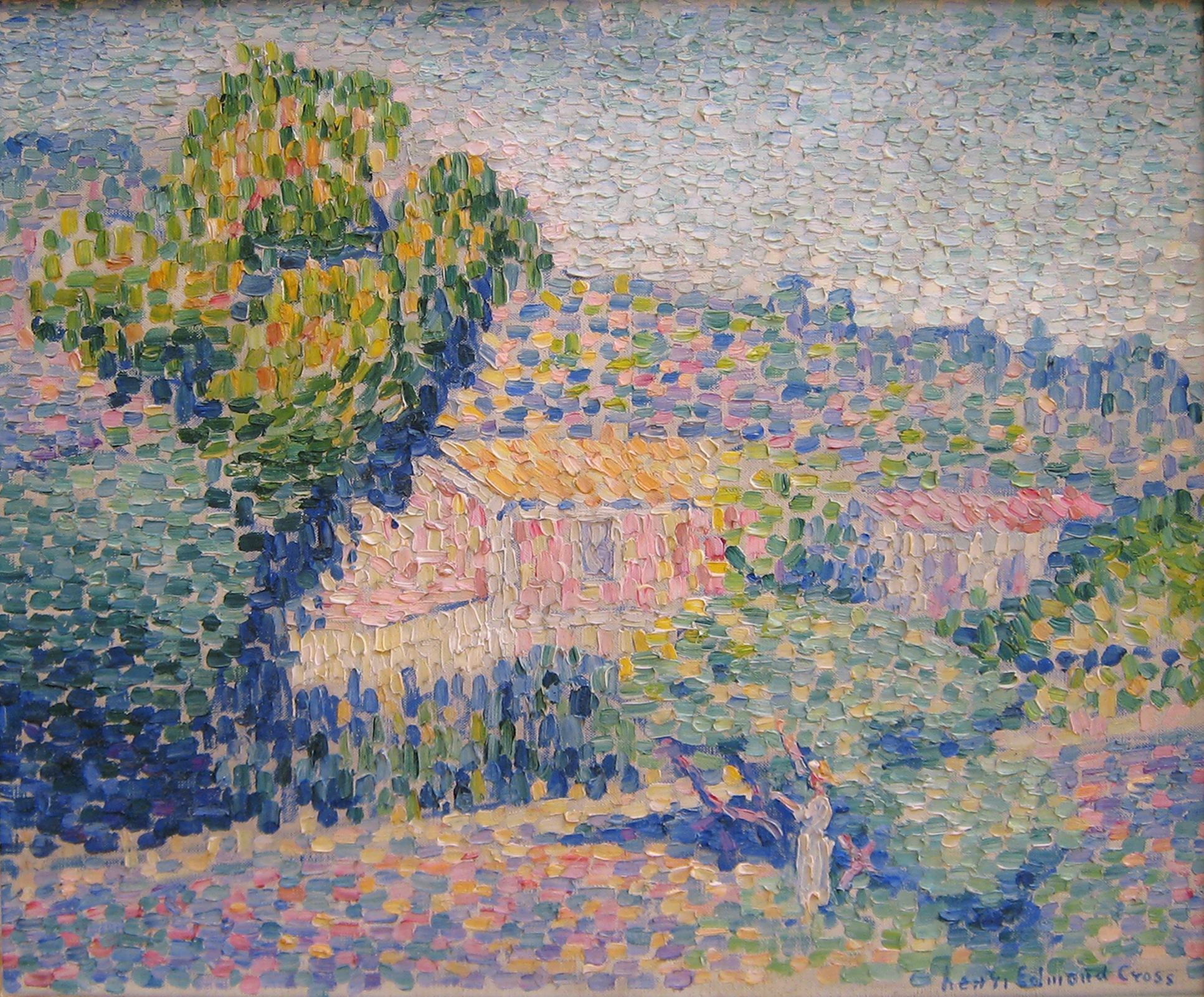
La maison rose, c. 1901–1905

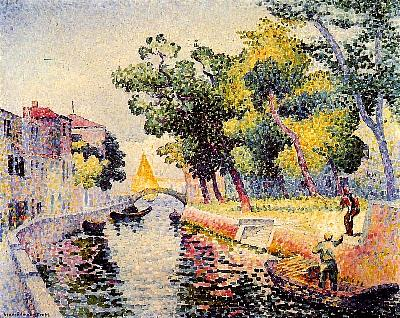
Ponte San Trovaso, 1902–1905

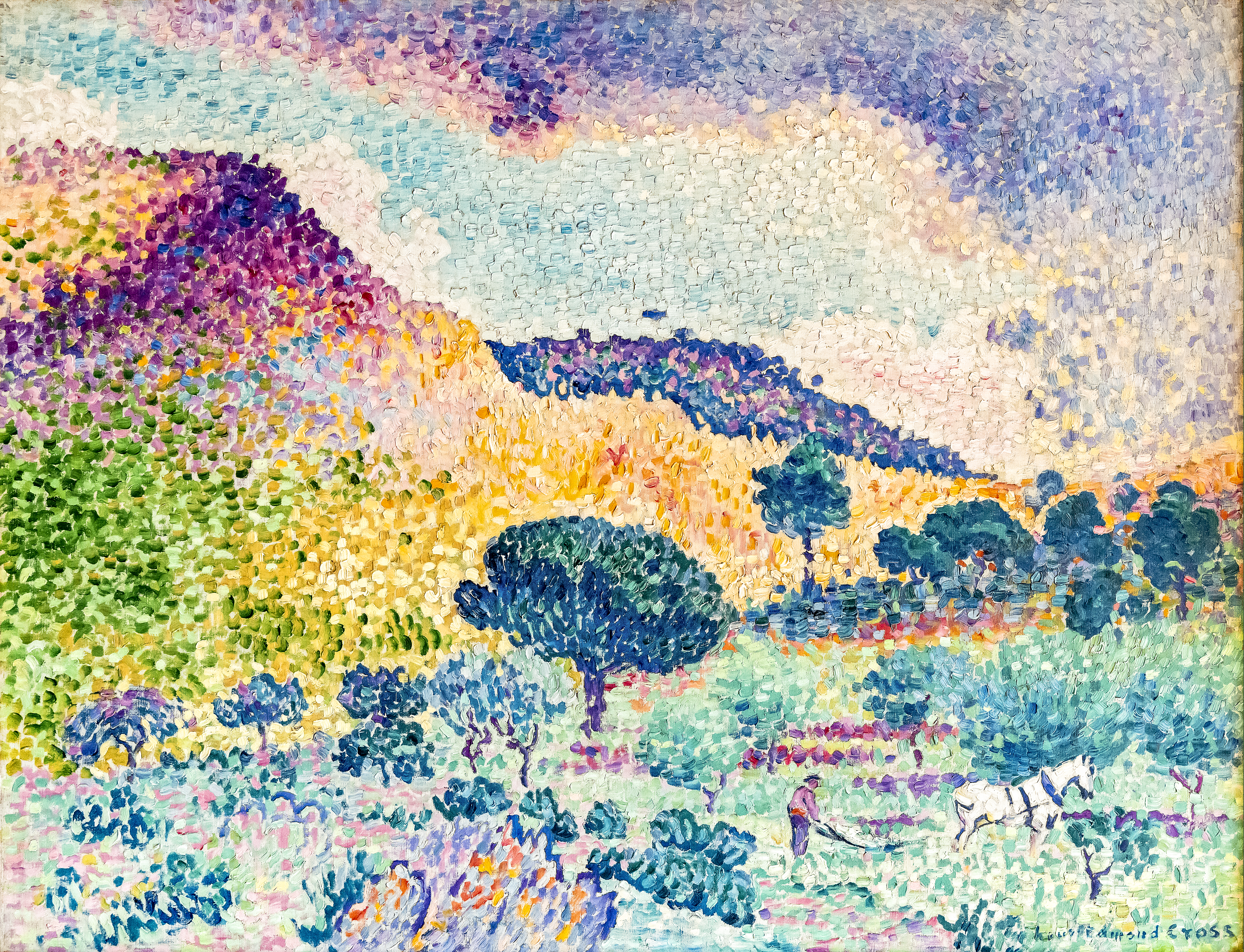
La Chaîne des Maures, 1906–1907

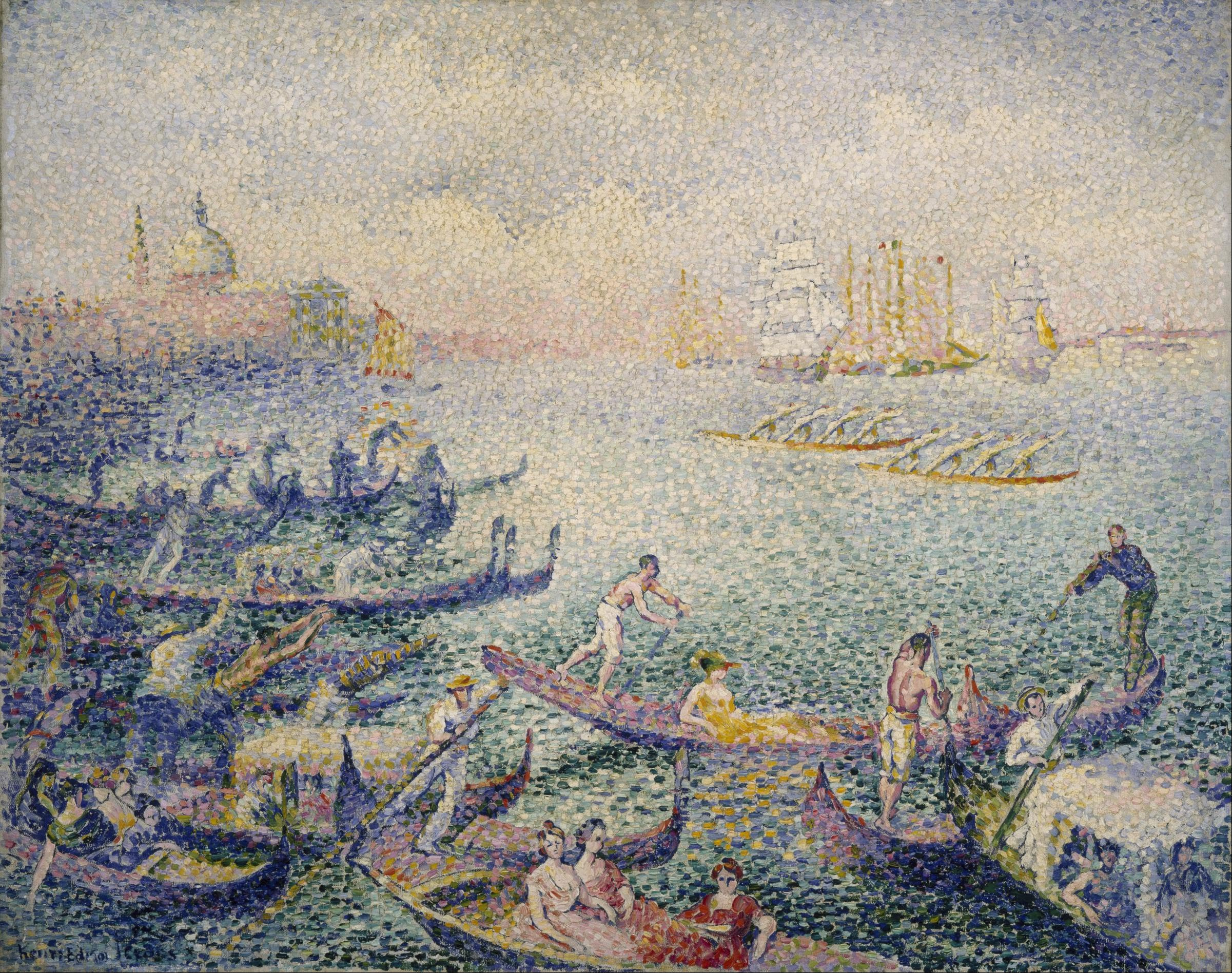
Regatta in Venice, 1898/1908

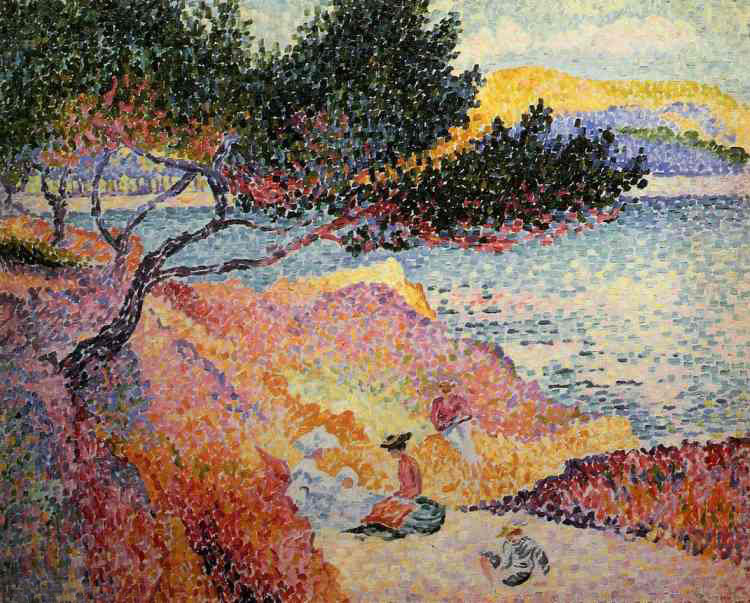
La baie à Cavalière, 1906–1907

Le Bois, 1906–1907

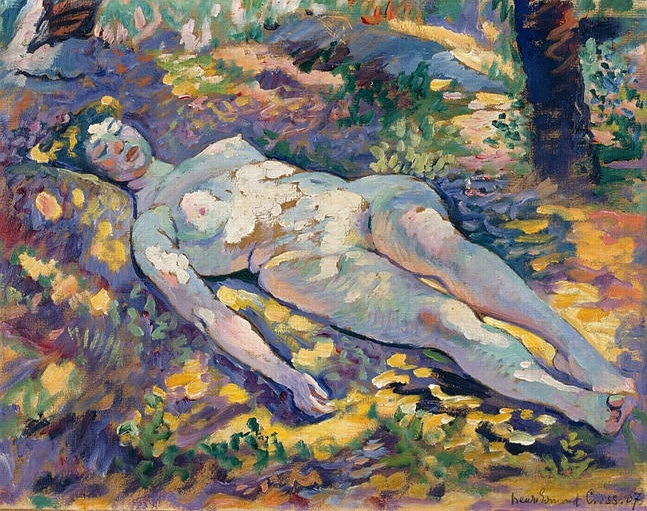
Dormeuse nue dans la clairière, 1907

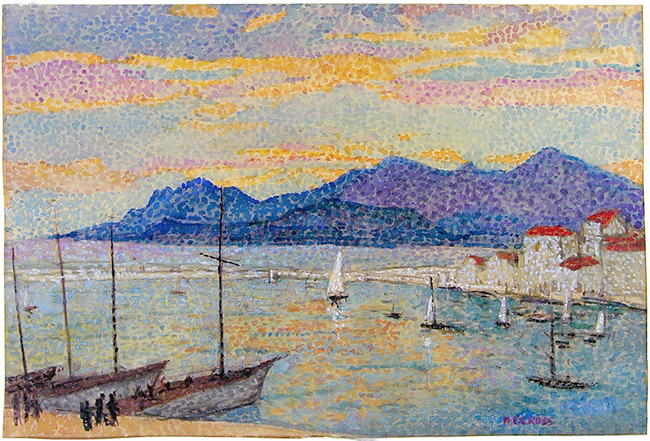
Hafenszene, by 1910

== Collections ==
Cross works in museums and public art galleries

- Allen Memorial Art Museum (Oberlin College, Ohio)
- Art Institute of Chicago
- Barnes Foundation (Philadelphia, Pennsylvania)
- Block Museum of Art (Northwestern University, Evanston, Illinois)
- Brooklyn Museum (New York City)
- Chrysler Museum of Art
- Cleveland Museum of Art
- Fine Arts Museums of San Francisco
- Finnish National Gallery (Helsinki, Finland)
- Harvard University Art Museums
- Hermitage Museum (Saint Petersburg, Russia)
- Honolulu Museum of Art
- Indianapolis Museum of Art
- Kröller-Müller Museum
- Kunstmuseum Basel (Switzerland)
- Los Angeles County Museum of Art
- Metropolitan Museum of Art (New York City)
- Museum Barberini (Potsdam, Germany)
- Museum of Grenoble (Grenoble, France)
- Musée d'Orsay (Paris)
- Musée Malraux (Le Havre, France)
- Musée Richard Anacréon (Granville, France)
- Museum of Modern Art (New York City)
- National Gallery of Art (Washington D.C.)
- New Art Gallery (Walsall, England)
- Statens Museum for Kunst (National Gallery of Denmark, Copenhagen)
- Tel Aviv Museum of Art
- Thyssen-Bornemisza Museum (Madrid)
- Wallraf-Richartz-Museum (Cologne, Germany)

== Sources ==
- Clement, Russell T.; Houzé, Annick (1999). Neo-impressionist Painters: A Sourcebook on Georges Seurat, Camille Pissarro, Paul Signac, Théo Van Rysselberghe, Henri Edmond Cross, Charles Angrand, Maximilien Luce, and Albert Dubois-Pillet. Westport, Conn.: Greenwood Press. ISBN 0-313-30382-7.
- Taddei, Jacques; Maingon, Claire; Baligand, Françoise; Szymusiak, Dominique (September 2011). "Henri Edmond Cross and Neo-Impressionism: From Seurat to Matisse" (PDF). Musée Marmottan Monet. Archived from the original (PDF) on 13 February 2012.
- Turner, Jane; Ward, Martha (2000). The Grove Dictionary of Art: From Monet to Cézanne: Late 19th-Century French Artists. New York, NY: St. Martin's Press. ISBN 0-312-22971-2.
