= Enrico Lionne =

Italian painter

Enrico Lione, the name chosen by Enrico Della Leonessa (1865–1921) was an Italian painter active in a Divisionist style.

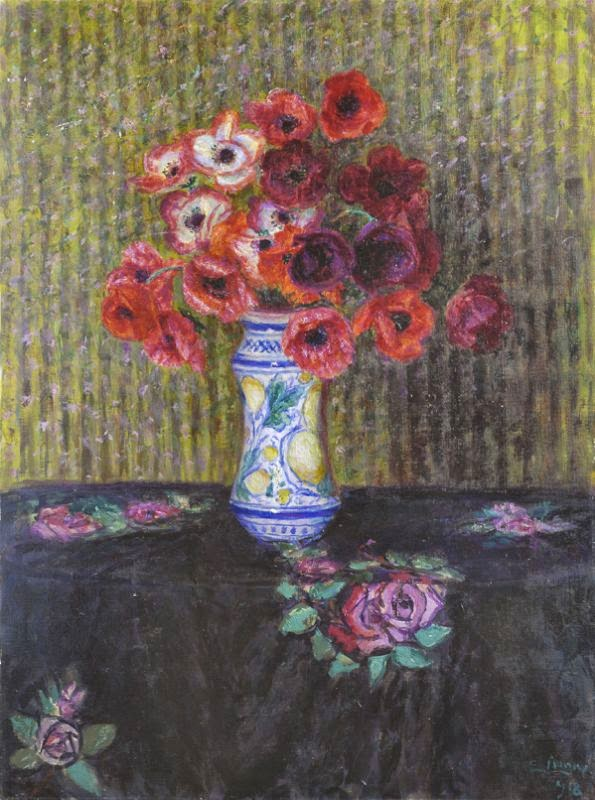
Enrico Lionne - Flowers

He was born and died in Naples. He trained and was active for many year in Rome.
