= Montespluga =

Village in Lombardy, Italy

Coordinates: 46°29′N 9°20′E

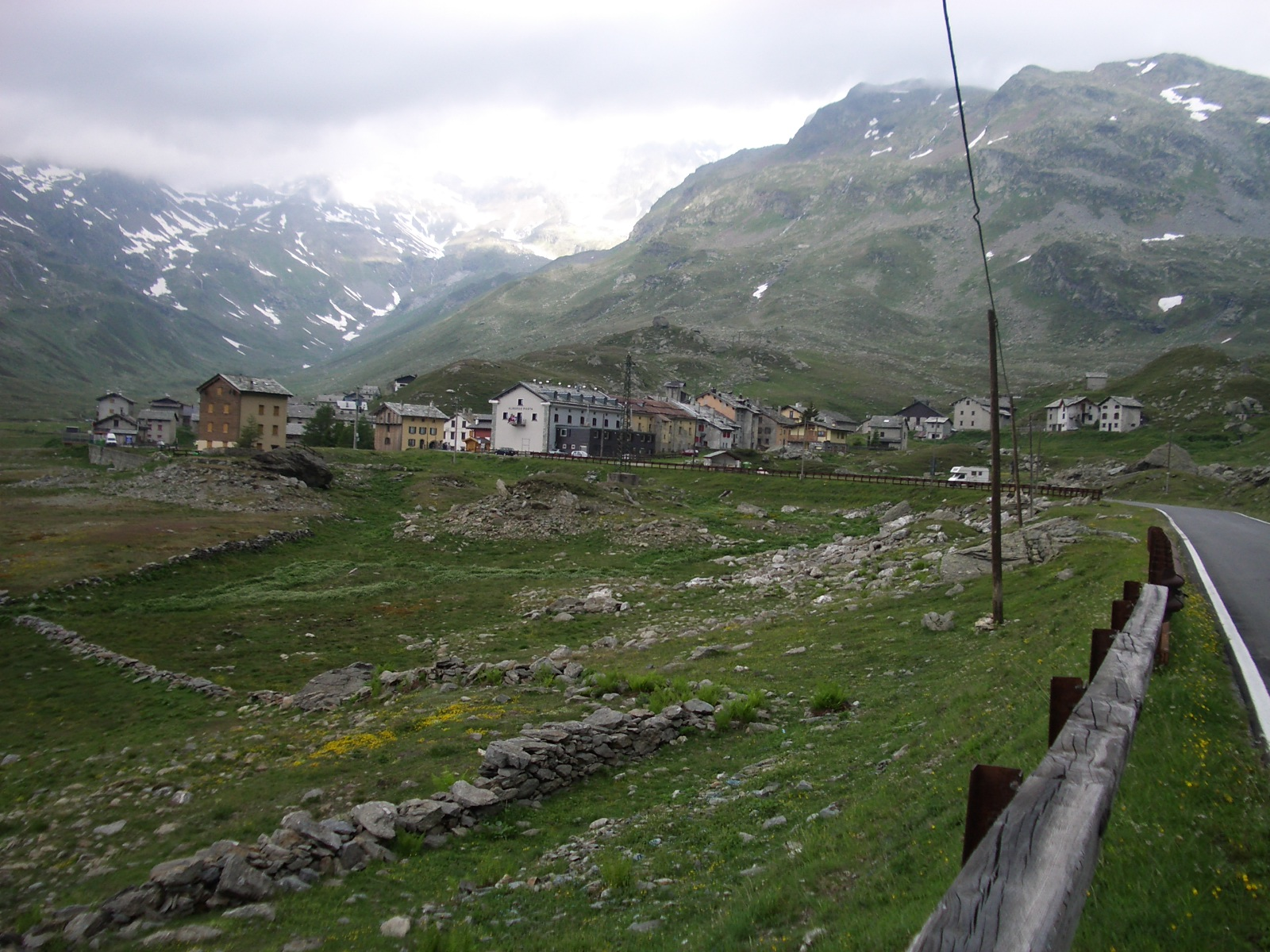
Montespluga in summer.

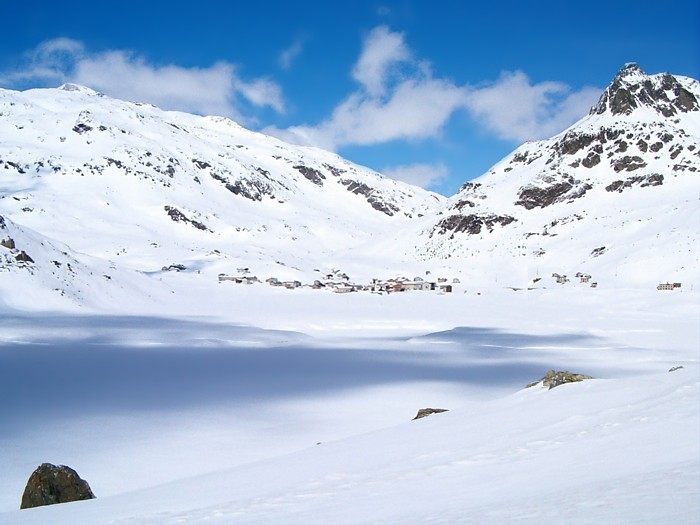
Winter view.

Montespluga is an Alpine village near the head of the Valle Spluga in the Italian region of Lombardy. It is a frazione of the comune of Madesimo, located at 1,908 m of altitude on the road to Chiavenna.

== Geography ==
The village marks the Italian end of the Splügen Pass (Italian: Passo dello Spluga, c. 3 km from the village). The Via Spluga was built by Emperor Augustus as a means to control Rhaetia, so Montespluga became important.

Since the opening of the San Bernardino tunnel to the west, the pass is no longer kept open in winter and the village can be cut off from both Italy and Switzerland.

The village consists of three main streets (Via Dogana, Via Ferre and Via Val Longa), a small shop and a couple of small hotels.

A reservoir lies to the south of the village.

Mountains nearby include the Pizzo Tambò, part of the Lepontine Alps.
