= Arturo Noci =

Italian painter (1874–1953)

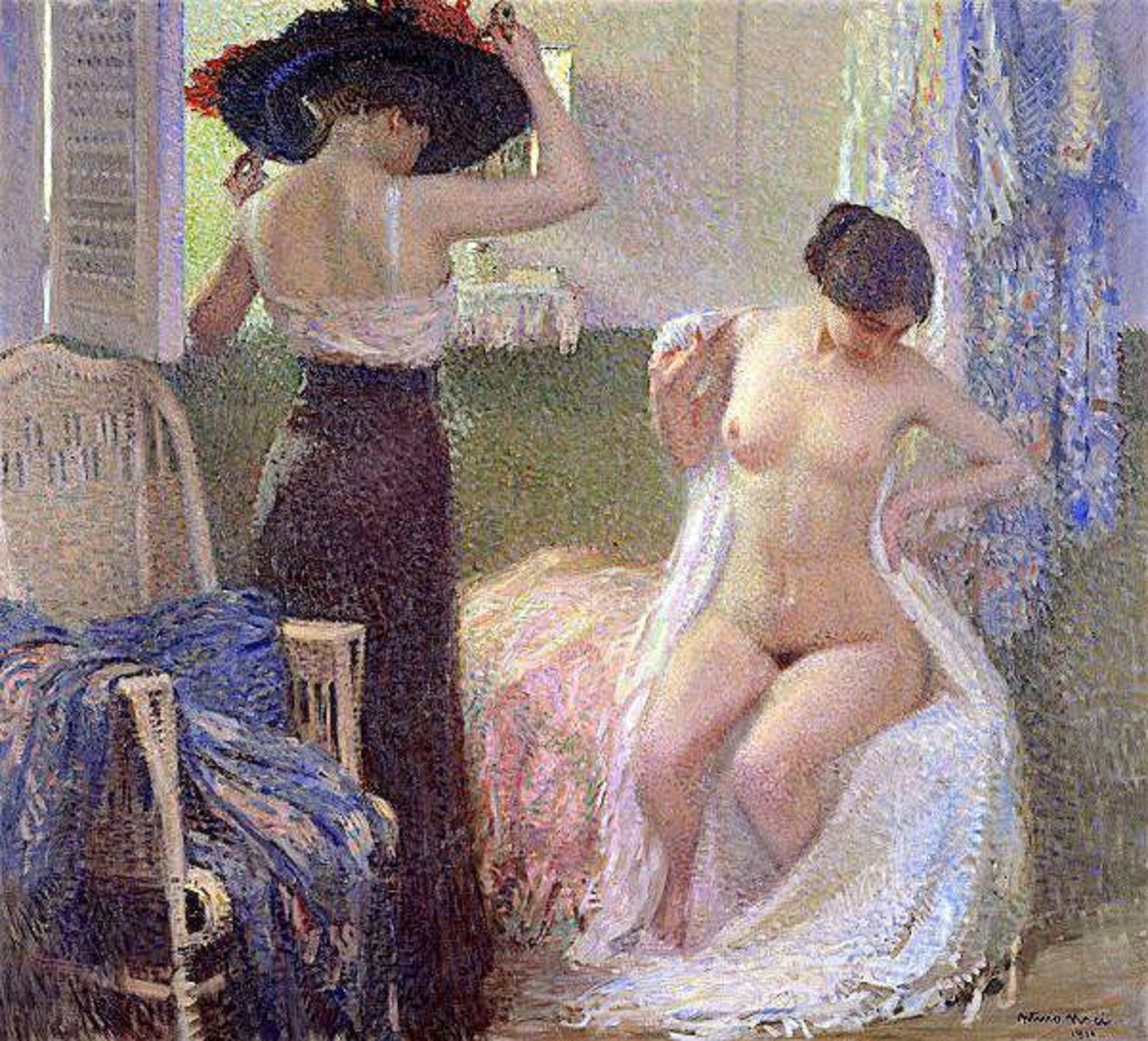

Arturo Noci (1874–1953) was an Italian painter active in a Divisionist style.

He was born in Rome and died in New York, where he lived from 1923 to 1953. He studied at the Institute of Fine Arts of Rome with Filippo Prosperi, and began his career painting landscapes in the style of Sartorio and Coleman.

When in New York, he became a favorite of high society and painted several portraits.
