= En ménage =

1881 novel by Joris-Karl Huysmans

En ménage (English: Married Life) is a novel by the French writer Joris-Karl Huysmans, first published in February 1881 by Charpentier. In 2025, a translation by George MacLennan, titled Domesticity, was published by Wakefield Press.

It tells the story of André Jayant, a novelist who marries a petty-minded woman called Berthe. When he walks in on Berthe in bed with another man, he leaves her to live first with a high-class prostitute called Blanche then with a working-class woman, Jeanne, with whom he had had a love affair five years before. When Jeanne is forced to leave for a job in London, André decides he cannot cope with life on his own and returns to his wife. The novel also features the artist Cyprien Tibaille, André's best friend, who had already appeared in Huysmans' previous novel, Les Soeurs Vatard. En ménage has autobiographical elements, with both André and Cyprien reflecting aspects of Huysmans' personality, and Huysmans' mistress Anna Meunier serving as a model for Jeanne.

The novel was Huysmans' third and his most ambitious to date. According to Robert Baldick, it differs from its predecessors, "Marthe and Les Soeurs Vatard in that its most impressive feature is characterization rather than description. This shift from pictorial to psychological interest is illustrated by the number of perceptive character studies — notably those of Berthe Jayant, her uncle M. Désableau, and the maidservant Mélanie.... It becomes even more obvious when one considers the two friends André Jayant and Cyprien Tibaille...." The novel was heavily criticised on its first appearance for its deep-seated pessimism about life. In this — as in many other features — it reflects the influence of one of Huysmans' favourite contemporary novels, Flaubert's L'Éducation Sentimentale. Huysmans, in fact, said that L'Éducation Sentimentale was "a hundred times better than" En ménage.

Robert Baldick writes, "In En Ménage, for the first time, [Huysmans] tries to recount his own experience of the inner life ... using a technique very similar to the 'inner monologue' beloved of twentieth-century novelists. En Ménage, in fact, is no typical Naturalist work, no sociological study in the Zola tradition, but a personal novel that looks back to Benjamin Constant and forward to Proust".

== Sources ==
- Huysmans Romans, Volume One (Bouquins, Robert Laffont, 2005)
- Baldick, Robert. The Life of J.-K. Huysmans (originally published by Oxford University Press, 1955; revised by Brendan King, Dedalus Press, 2006)
