= Les lauriers sont coupés =

1887 novel by Édouard Dujardin

Les lauriers sont coupés (French pronunciation: [le lɔʁje sɔ̃ kupe], "The laurels are cut") is an 1887 novel by French author Édouard Dujardin, first published in the magazine Revue Indépendante. He was an early user of the literary technique stream of consciousness, and Les lauriers exemplifies the style. Dujardin claimed later, in a study of the technique and its application in Ulysses (1922) by James Joyce, that he was the first to use it in Les lauriers.

The title derives from a French children's song, "Nous n'irons plus au bois" ("We'll go to the woods no more"), where the withering of the laurel tree is a prelude to regrowth, the latter period marked by joyous song and dance. The novel adheres to that spirit, capturing the thoughts of a student in Paris over a six-hour period in the spring.

== Background ==
Like many symbolists, Dujardin believed music to be an expression of interior life. In turn, interior monologue, (Note: The terminology is far from clear, as is further discussed below. Gleb Struve prefers "inner monologue" as a translation for the French monologue intérieur, which he prefers "to the more common 'internal monologue' or the even worse 'interior monologue'".) being a-rationalist and anti-intellectual, could point the novel's way toward expressing the unconscious. Analogous with music (music being taken as the origin of language), interior monologue had an affinity with a more primitive and thus more original language. Like many symbolists, Dujardin had been greatly impressed with the music of Richard Wagner, and how important Wagner was to him and others was made clear by the foundation (with Téodor de Wyzewa) in 1885 of the journal La Revue wagnérienne. Interior monologue, then, was to be the translation of the musical (and Wagnerian) idea of the Leitmotif into the novel, and narrative subjectivism to be the dominant perspective.

== Plot ==
The novel's plot is purposely underdeveloped, as Dujardin acknowledged in a later essay on his novel and its technique, Le Monologue intérieur (1931), and especially in a letter written a year after the novel's publication. His is a "roman de quelques heures, d'une action banale, d'un personnage quelconque"—a novel whose narrative time is only a few hours, of a banal action, with a random [main] character. It concerns a naïve and amorous student, Daniel Prince, who is about to be taken in by an actress, Léa d'Arsay, whose only interest is his money. As the novel develops, Prince daydreams of proposing the actress to elope with him, and when he is in her apartment, before they are to take an evening stroll, he falls asleep and dreams of his past, of his parents and the first girl he fell in love with.

== Technique and definition ==
According to Dujardin, the idea was to represent a character's thoughts as directly as possible, with the least possible mediation from an author—thoughts were to be represented as if they were a monologue directed at no one, and the author was not to comment on any of it. Syntax was of no concern, since the thoughts were to be as close as possible to the character's unconscious. Lawrence Edward Bowling points out that Dujardin's arguments actually covered a wide range of possible interiority, since the character's words are at the same time almost-conscious speech as well as almost-unconscious unordered thought. Bowling distinguishes between "stream of consciousness" and "interior monologue" and finds both in the novel; the former, he says, occurs clearly and most perfectly in a dream sequence (when "the mind drops below the level of language usage and functions by means of pure images and sensations"), but much of the other material in the novel is thought turned so consciously into language that it is far from unmediated.

The question of narrative technique (also called "Unframed Direct Interior Monologue", or UDIM) remains a matter of some critical discussion. In addition, between French and English there is some confusion regarding the technical terminology: in French, monologue intérieur means both "stream of consciousness" and "interior monologue"; the latter, it is suggested, could be seen as an extreme version of the former precluding, for instance, multiple viewpoints (such multiplicity is rejected by Dujardin).

German erlebte Rede is related.

== Theory and influence ==
Though the invention of the stream of consciousness technique is frequently ascribed to Dujardin, from the 1920s to the 1950s there was considerable discussion about Dujardin's claim, though it was supported by James Joyce and Joyce's friend and translator Valery Larbaud in the 1920s, even before Dujardin made those very claims in Le Monologue intérieur. There were other candidates as well: Elizabeth Drew, in 1926, proposed Dorothy Richardson, and Katherine Gerould, in 1927, Henry James. In addition, passages from Fyodor Dostoevsky are sometimes cited as precursors, passages which Dujardin attempted to differentiate from his own writing. Lawrence Richard Bowling, however, after defining the stream of consciousness technique as "that narrative method by which the author attempts to give a direct quotation of the mind – not merely of the language area but of the whole consciousness", finds that Richardson's prose has much more authorial mediation than Dujardin's. Still, Dujardin has his detractors; poet and literary historian Gleb Struve finds other authors who he says experimented with the form long before Dujardin, including Leo Tolstoy (and he credits Nikolay Chernyshevsky with describing it as such) and Laurence Sterne. (Note: Struve points to the little-known Russian author Andrei Bely as another early twentieth-century practitioner of the genre.)

The novel's greatest influence was that on Joyce. He mentioned in 1922 to Larbaud that it had been his inspiration for Ulysses; Larbaud, in turn, got Les lauriers republished and, by associating Joyce and Dujardin, helped resurrect the latter's career.

The novel was translated into English by Stuart Gilbert, and published in 1938 by New Directions Publishing as We'll to the Woods No More. That title is the first line of the prefatory poem in Last Poems (1922) by A. E. Housman. Its second line is "The laurels are all cut", which suggests that Housman may have known the French original.
