= Albert Dubois-Pillet =

French painter (1846–1890)

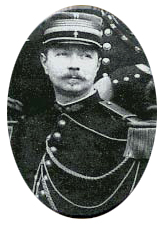
Albert Dubois-Pillet

Albert Dubois-Pillet (French pronunciation: [albɛʁ dybwa pijɛ]; 28 October 1846 – 18 August 1890) was a French Neo-impressionist painter and a career army officer. He was instrumental in the founding of the Société des Artistes Indépendants, and was one of the first artists to embrace Pointillism.

== Early life and military service ==
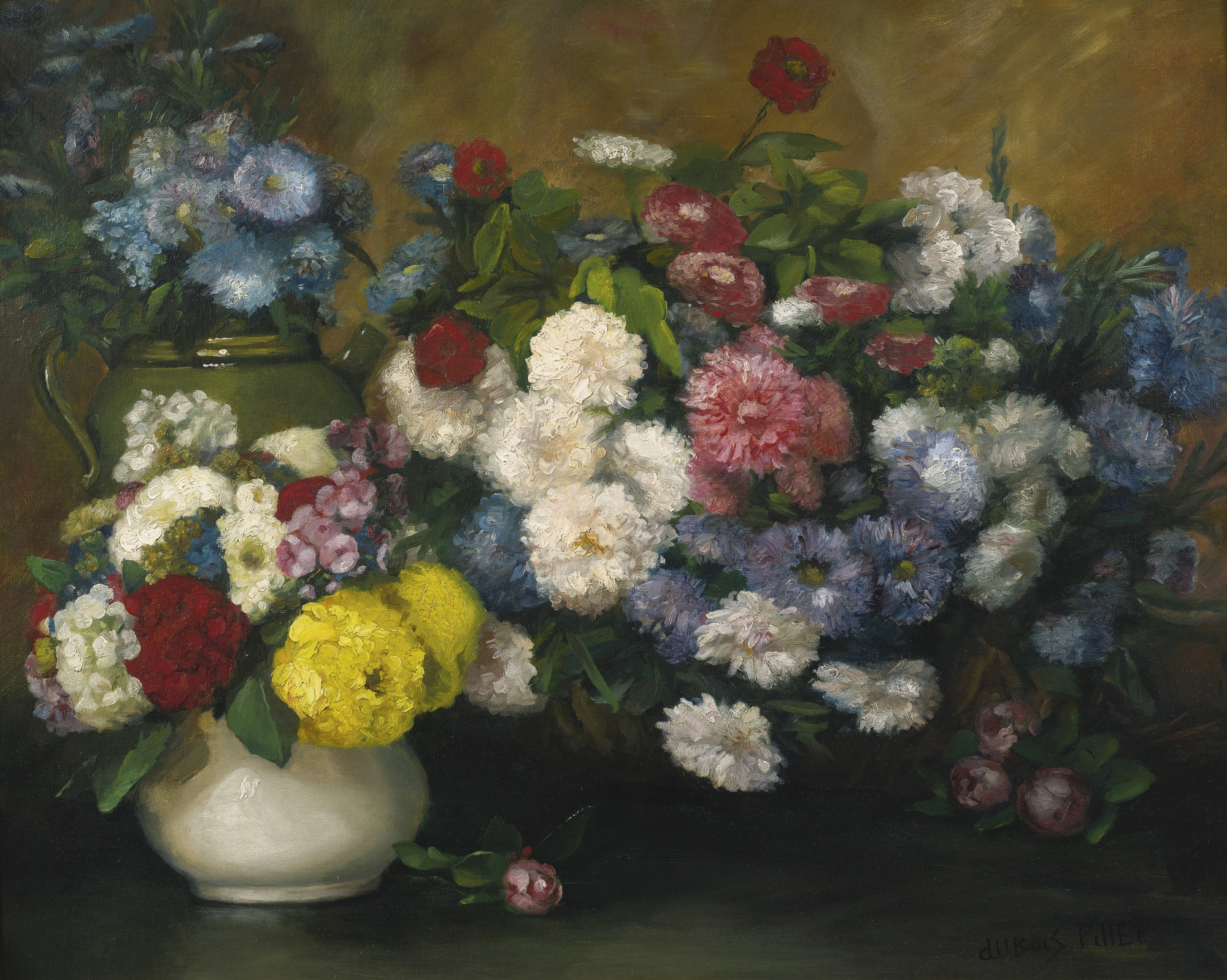
Flowers in Three Vases, c. 1879

Louis-Auguste-Albert Dubois was born on 28 October 1846 in Paris. Shortly thereafter, his family moved to Toulouse, where he was raised. In 1867, he graduated from l'Ecole Impériale Militaire in Saint-Cyr and began his career as a military officer. He remained in the army for the rest of his life.

From 1870 to 1871, he served in the Franco-Prussian War, during which the Germans captured him and held him in Westphalia, Prussia as a prisoner of war. After his release, he resumed a post in the Versailles army. Throughout the 1870s he was stationed at several different provincial posts. He received an appointment in 1879 or 1880 to la Légion de la Garde Républicaine (the Republican Guard) in Paris.

== Early art career ==
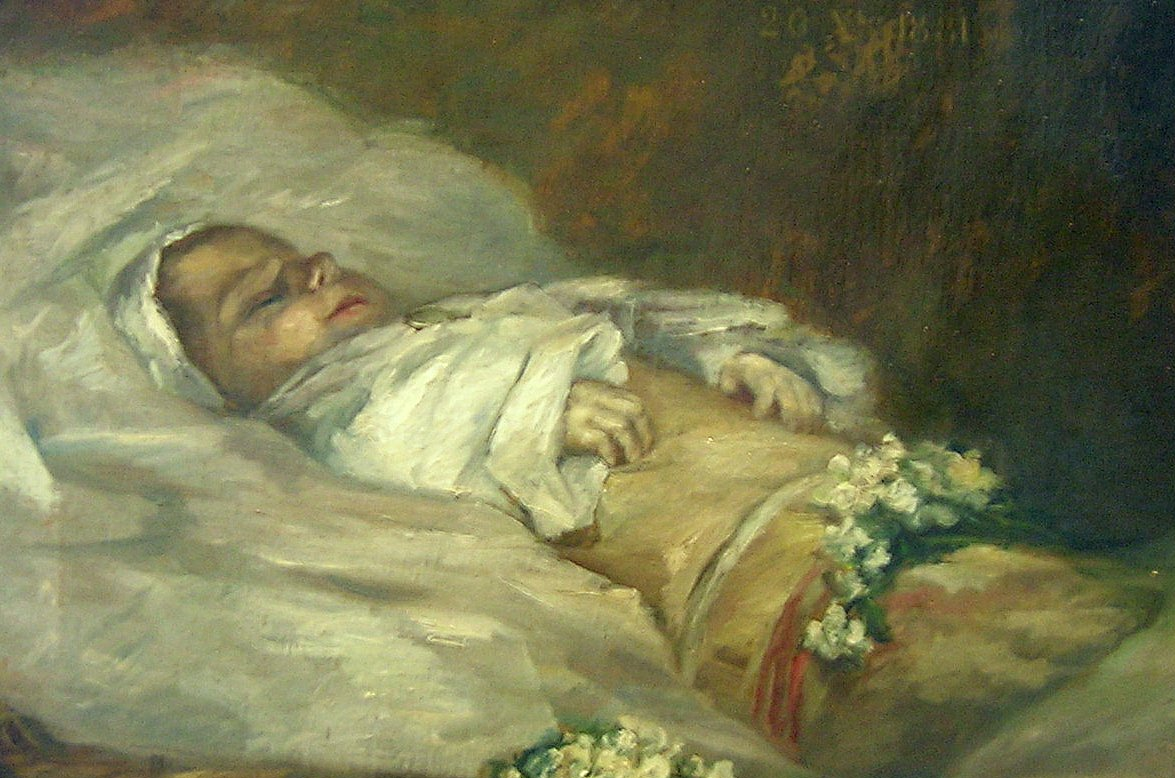
Detail from Enfant Mort, 1881

Although self-taught, with no formal art education, he proved to be a talented artist. The official Paris Salon accepted one of his still lifes in 1877, and another one in 1879. However, after his arrival in Paris, he created paintings which were somewhat more experimental, and his submissions were rejected by The Salons from 1880 to 1883.

Beginning in 1884, he attempted to hide his art-related activities from the military by disguising his name – he added "Pillet", his mother's maiden name, to his name, signing his artworks "Dubois-Pillet".

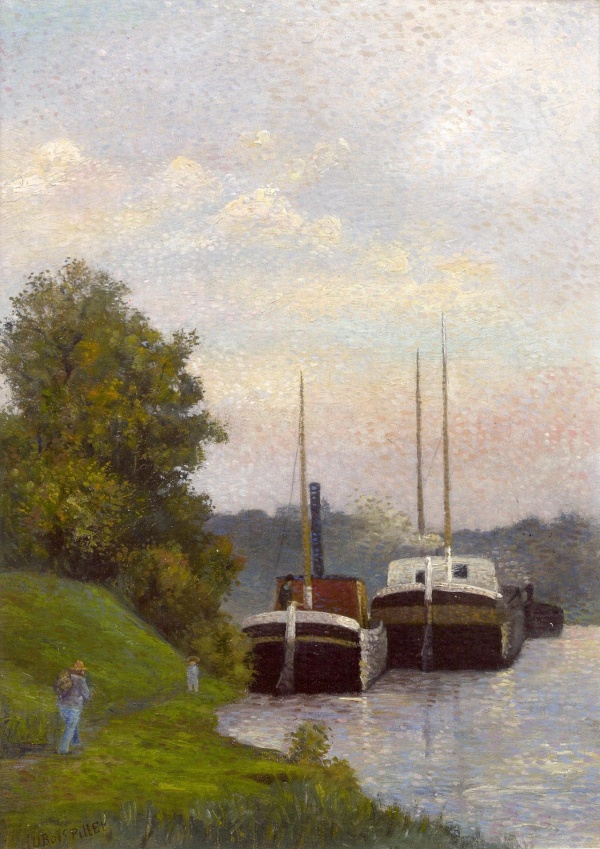
Charlands Sur La-Seine

His painting Enfant Mort (Dead Child), completed in 1881, was displayed at the May 1884 Tuileries Exhibition, where it caught the attention of Émile Zola, who used it as his inspiration for a scene in his 1886 novel L'Œuvre. In the book, artist Claude Lantier, distraught over his son's death, finds himself compelled to create a painting of his dead child.

The Tuileries Exhibition was a one-time event with a goal similar to that of 1863's Salon des Refusés, which showed works that had been rejected by the Salon. Dubois-Pillet envisioned a permanent alternative to the official Salon. He met with some of the other exhibitors, and he, Georges Seurat, Paul Signac, and Odilon Redon became the "founding fathers" of the Société des Artistes Indépendants. Dubois-Pillet structured the organization and, within less than a week, wrote and published its statutes, which are largely still in effect. The society was officially formed on 29 July 1884, and their first exhibition, which opened on 1 December 1884, included work by Dubois-Pillet. He used his connections to secure desirable venues and terms for their exhibitions, was the primary organizer of the group until 1888, and was a regular exhibitor with them until 1889.

== Neo-impressionism ==
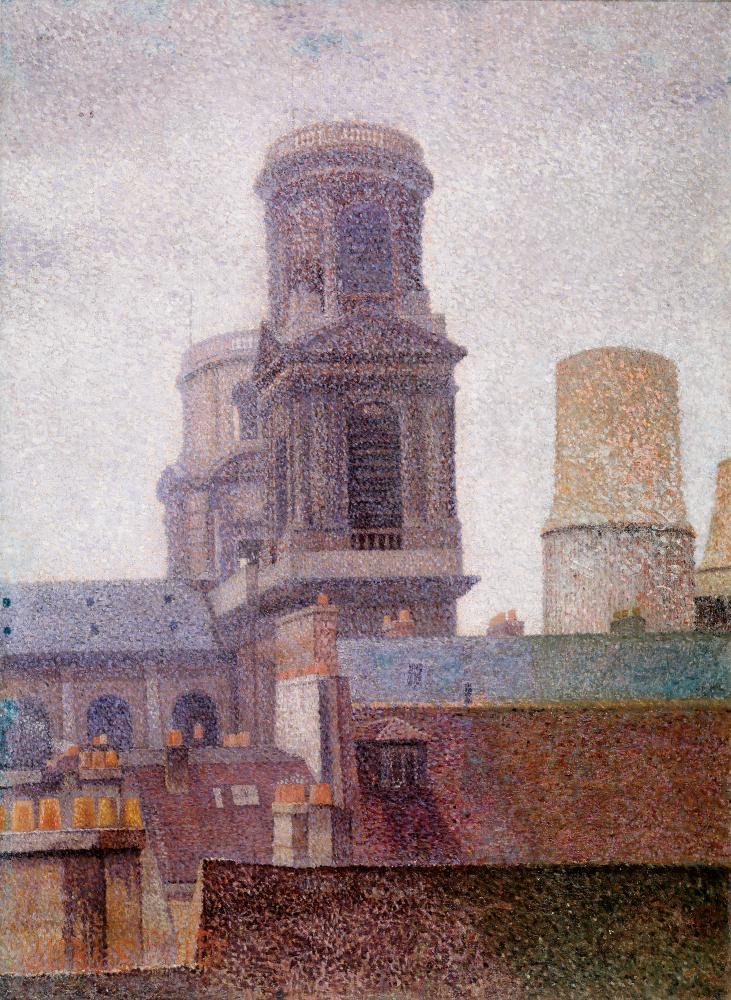
The Towers, Saint-Sulpice, 1887

Around 1885, probably influenced by his friendships with Seurat and others, he began experimenting with Divisionist techniques, and he embraced Pointillism – one of the first artists to do so. By the next year, his works were fully Neo-impressionist. With Signac, he used pen and ink to create pointillist drawings. Dubois-Pillet's studio-apartment served as the unofficial Neo-impressionist headquarters during the movement's early years. Some of his pointillist work is composed with "photographic precision".

In 1886, he was ordered by the army to stop exhibiting his art, and to dissociate himself from Les Indépendants. Dubois-Pillet paid little attention to these orders. He remained active with Les Indépendants and continued to show his work, including regular Les Indépendants exhibits, an 1886 Nantes show, and participation in the 1888 and 1889 Les XX exhibitions in Brussels. His only solo exhibition during his lifetime was in 1888, at the offices of French symbolist journal Revue Indépendante. Some of his pointillist drawings were published in La Vie moderne in 1887.

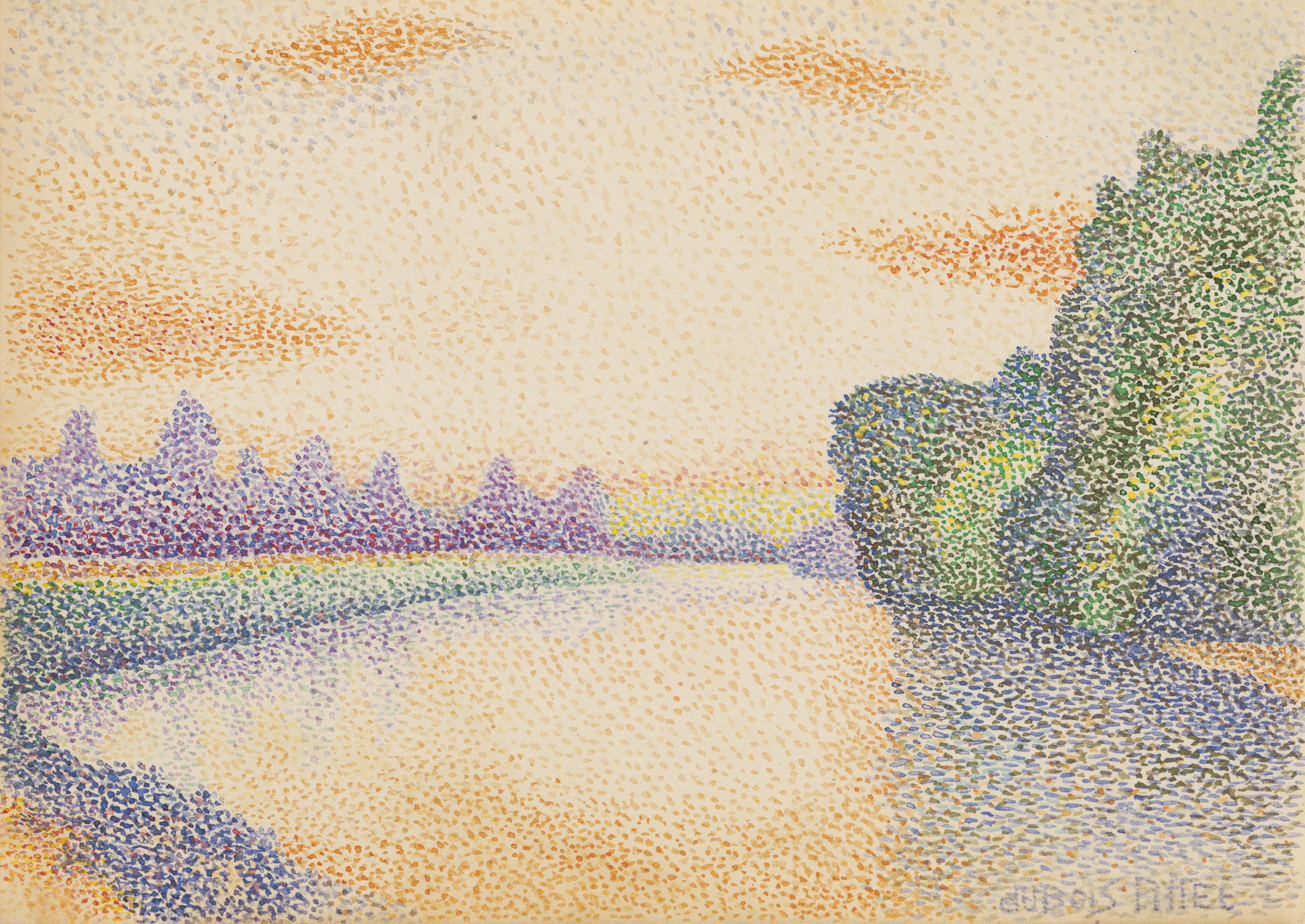
The Banks of the Marne at Dawn, c. 1888

Dubois-Pillet and Louis Hayet were the two Neo-impressionists who were most focused on the theoretical aspects and scientific basis of their art. Starting around 1887, Dubois-Pillet explored the science of color perception as it related to Pointillism by investigating the work of English polymath Thomas Young (1773–1829), who concluded that the eye has three color receptors, each sensitive to one of the primary colors of light (green, red, and violet). Dubois-Pillet applied Young's findings into a triad color theory which he referred to as passage, whereby a touch of pigment corresponding to each of the primary light colors is included in the passage from one hue to the next. Colors are scientifically decomposed by the artist, then they are recomposed in the viewer's eye, but with a greater luminosity than would have been possible if the colors had simply been mixed on the palette. How to apply his theory in practice wasn't entirely clear, and his fellow Neo-impressionists were not convinced.

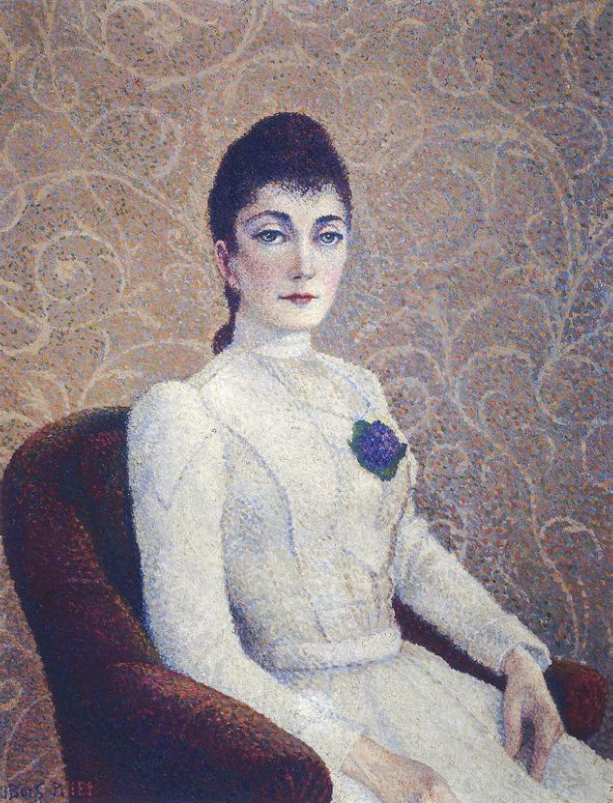
La Dame à la Robe Blanche, c. 1886

Neo-impressionism was often focused on depicting brilliant colors in natural light, and perhaps because of this, the subject matter most commonly consisted of outdoor scenes such as landscapes, cityscapes, seascapes, or river scenes. While Dubois-Pillet painted all of these, as well as still lifes, he also created the first portrait of the Neo-impressionist movement – La Dame à la Robe Blanche, a painting which depicts a woman, wearing a white dress, seated in an upholstered chair. The model's identity is unknown; exhibition curators tended to, at best, identify subjects by the initial of their last name. The Musée d'Art Moderne de Saint-Etienne refers to her as Madame P., but art critic Félix Fénéon called her Mademoiselle B.

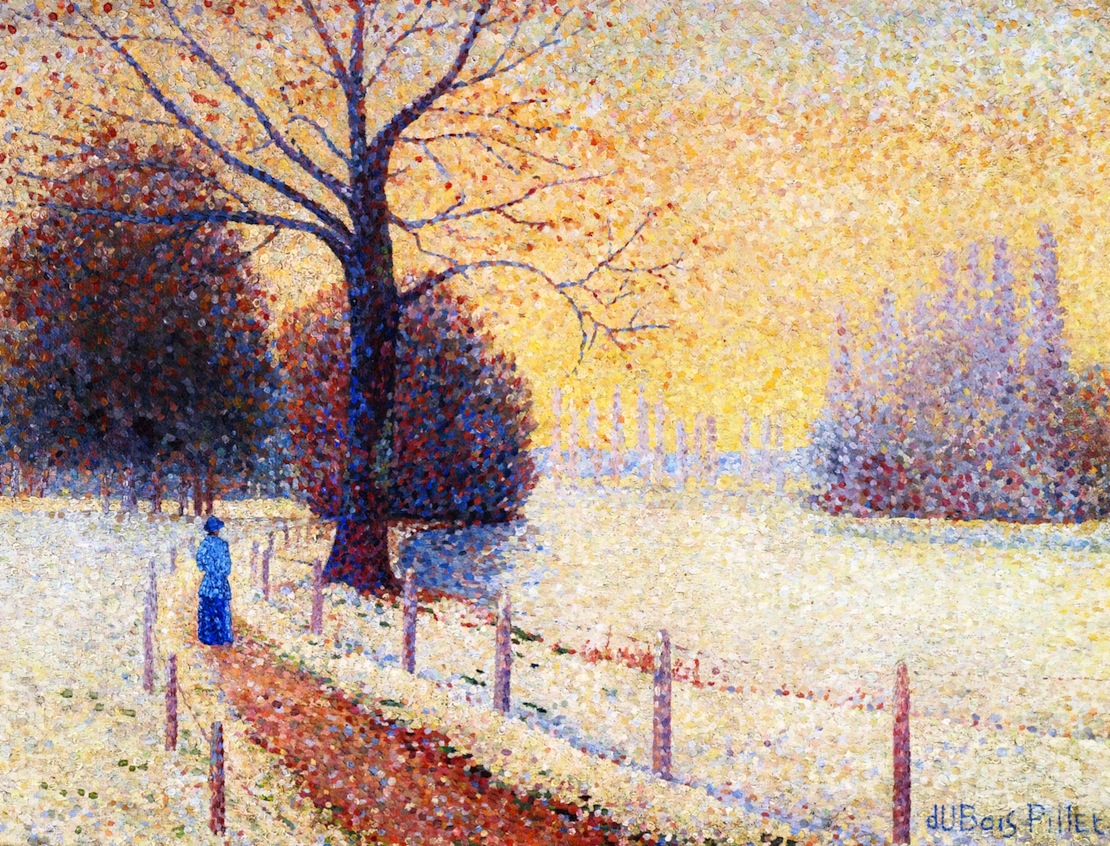
Le Puy in the Snow, 1889

In late 1889, Dubois-Pillet was transferred by the army to a post as commander of the gendarmerie in Le Puy-en-Velay, a south central French commune. His transfer may have been in response to his defying the orders to curtail his artistic activities.

The churches and landscapes of the surrounding Auvergne region are the subject matter of his final paintings. He died in Le Puy-en-Velay on 18 August 1890 at the age of 43 during an outbreak of smallpox. The following year, a memorial exhibition, organized by Signac and consisting of sixty-four of Dubois-Pillet's paintings, was mounted by Les Indépendants. Because of a fire which destroyed the majority of his work, as well as his rather early death, his extant oeuvre is relatively small.

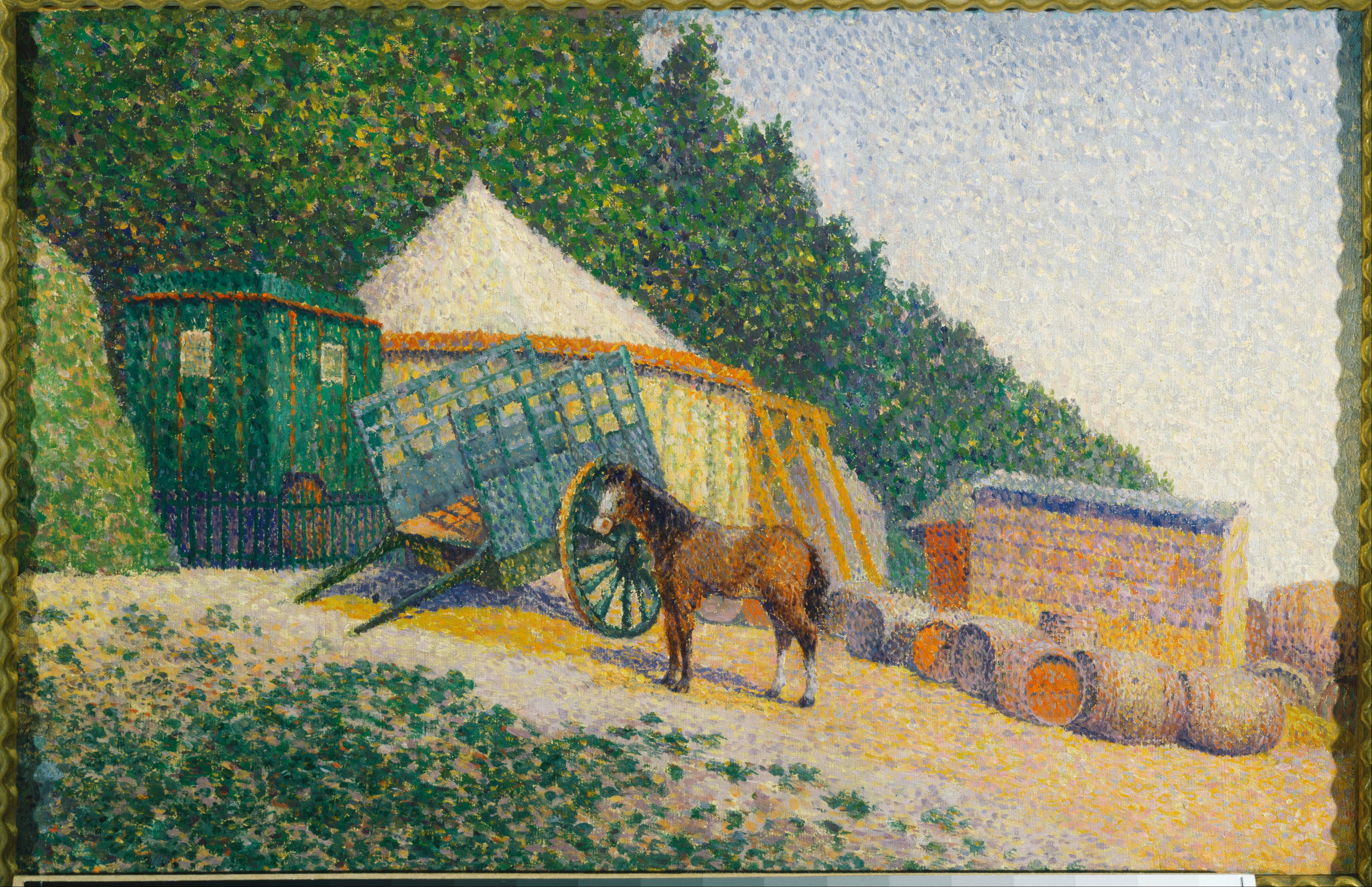
Little Circus Camp

== Collections ==
- Indianapolis Museum of Art
- J. Paul Getty Museum
- Musée Crozatier
- Musée d'Art Moderne, Saint-Étienne
- Musée d'Orsay
- Musée du Petit Palais, Geneva
- The Phillips Collection

== Gallery ==
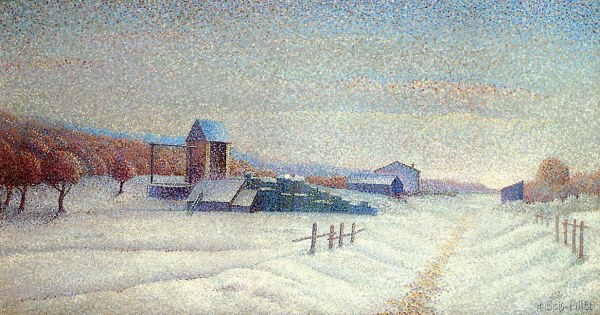
Winter Landscape, c. 1885

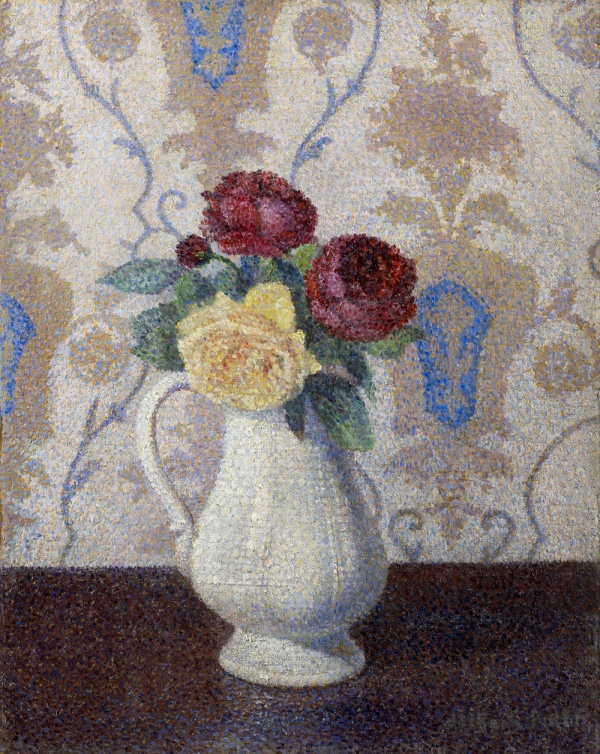
Bouquet de Roses Dans un Vase, c. 1885

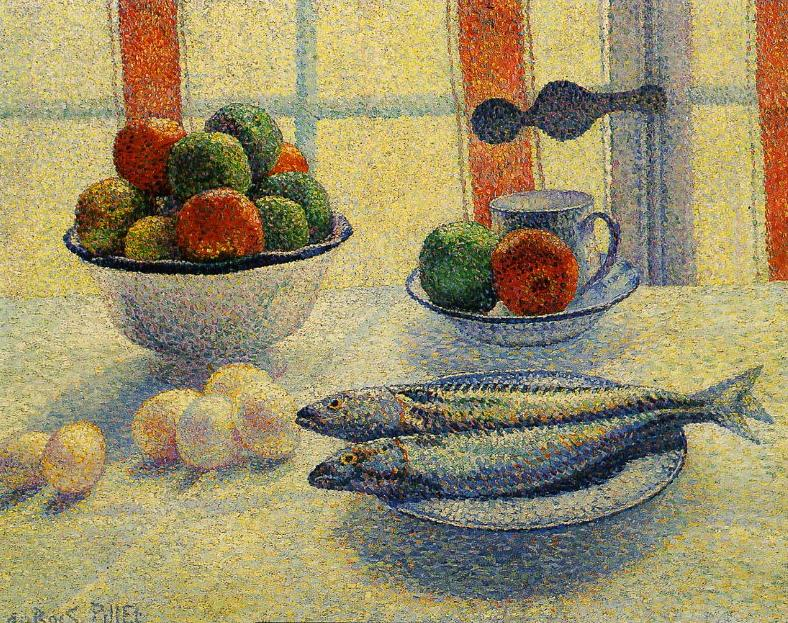
Still life with Fish, c. 1885

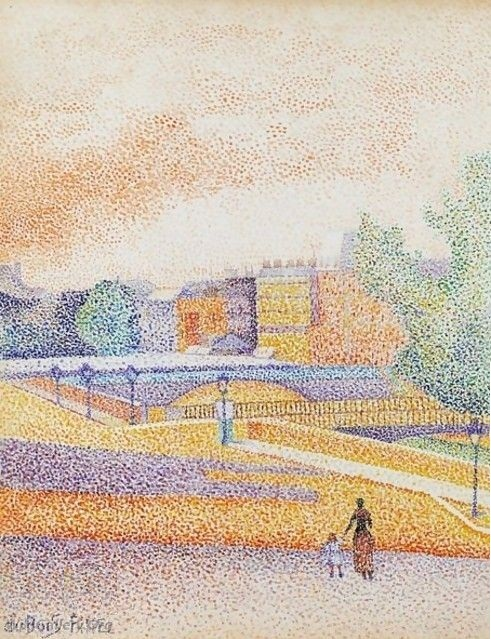
Vue de Paris, 1885

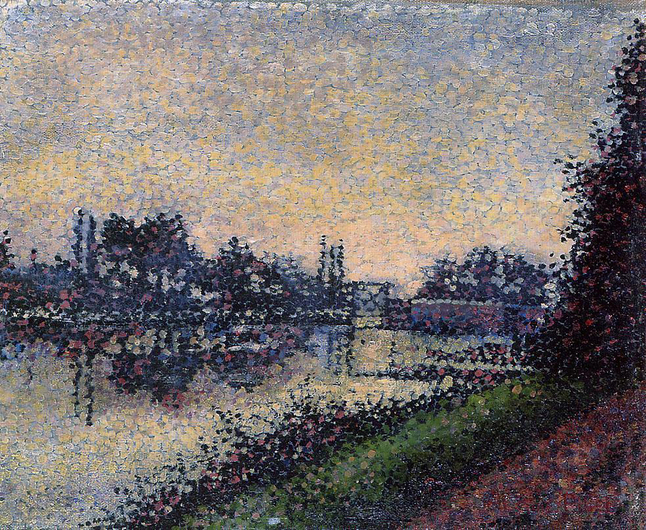
Landscape with a Lock, c. 1885

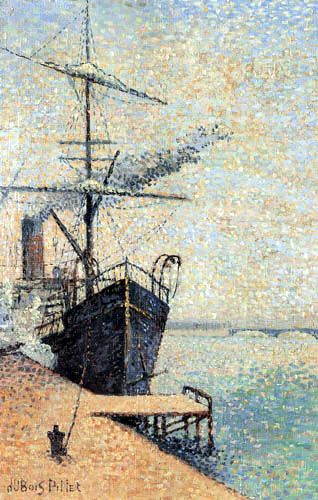
Ankerplaats, 1885

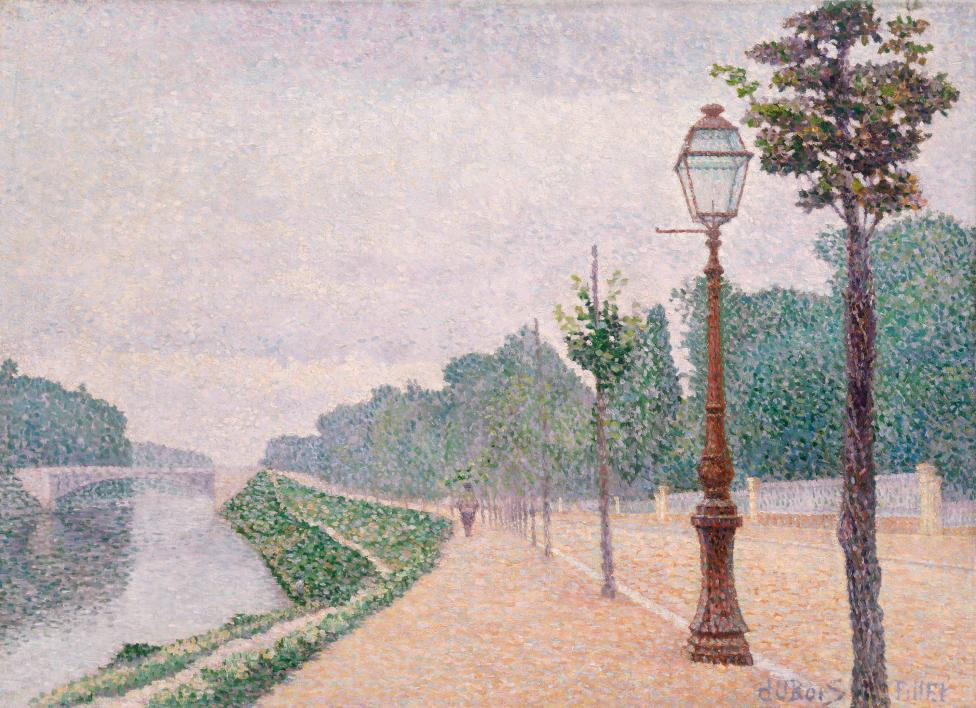
The Banks of the Seine at Neuilly, 1886

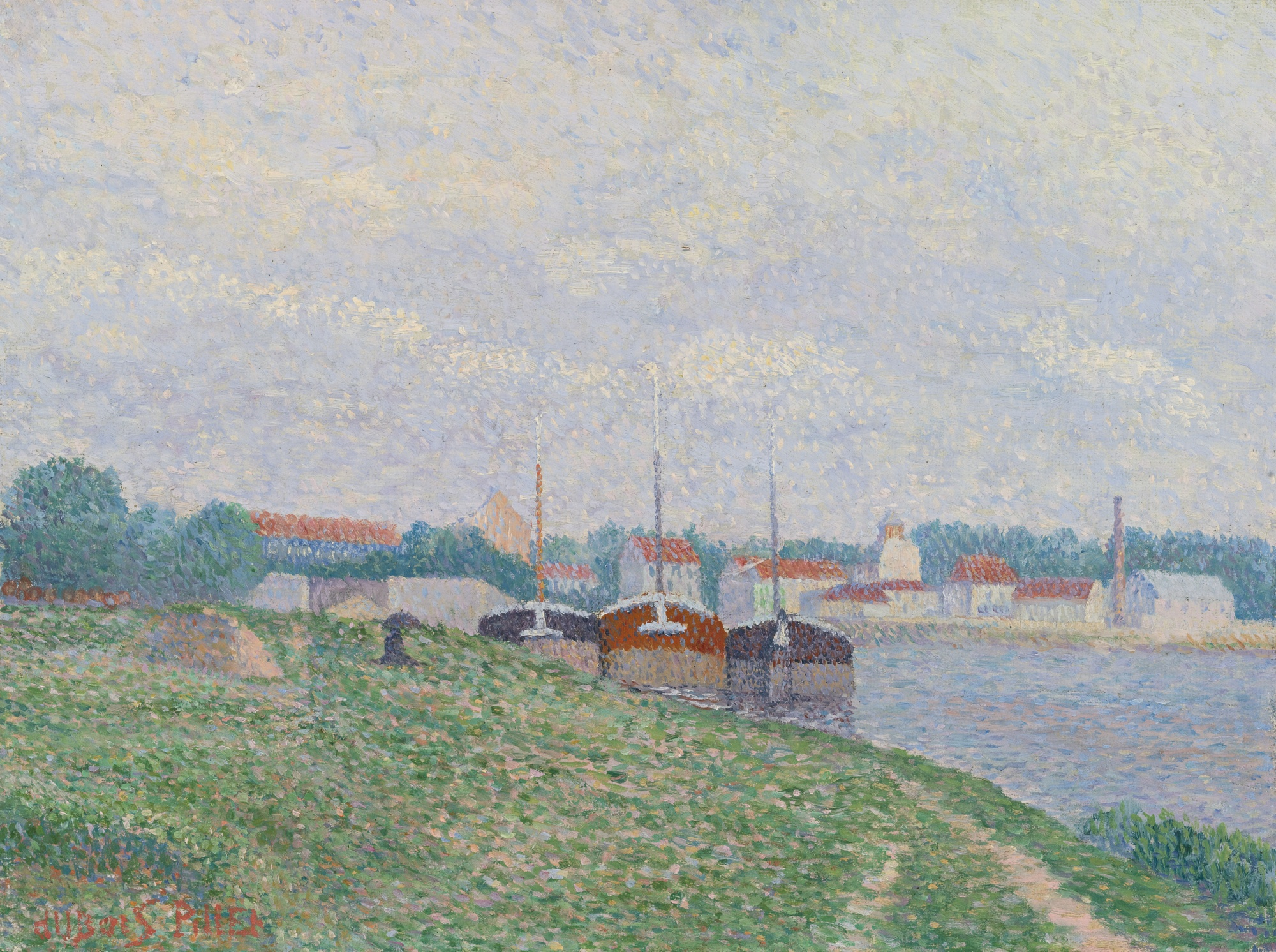
Trois Péniches Amarées aux Abords d'une Ville Industrielle, c. 1886

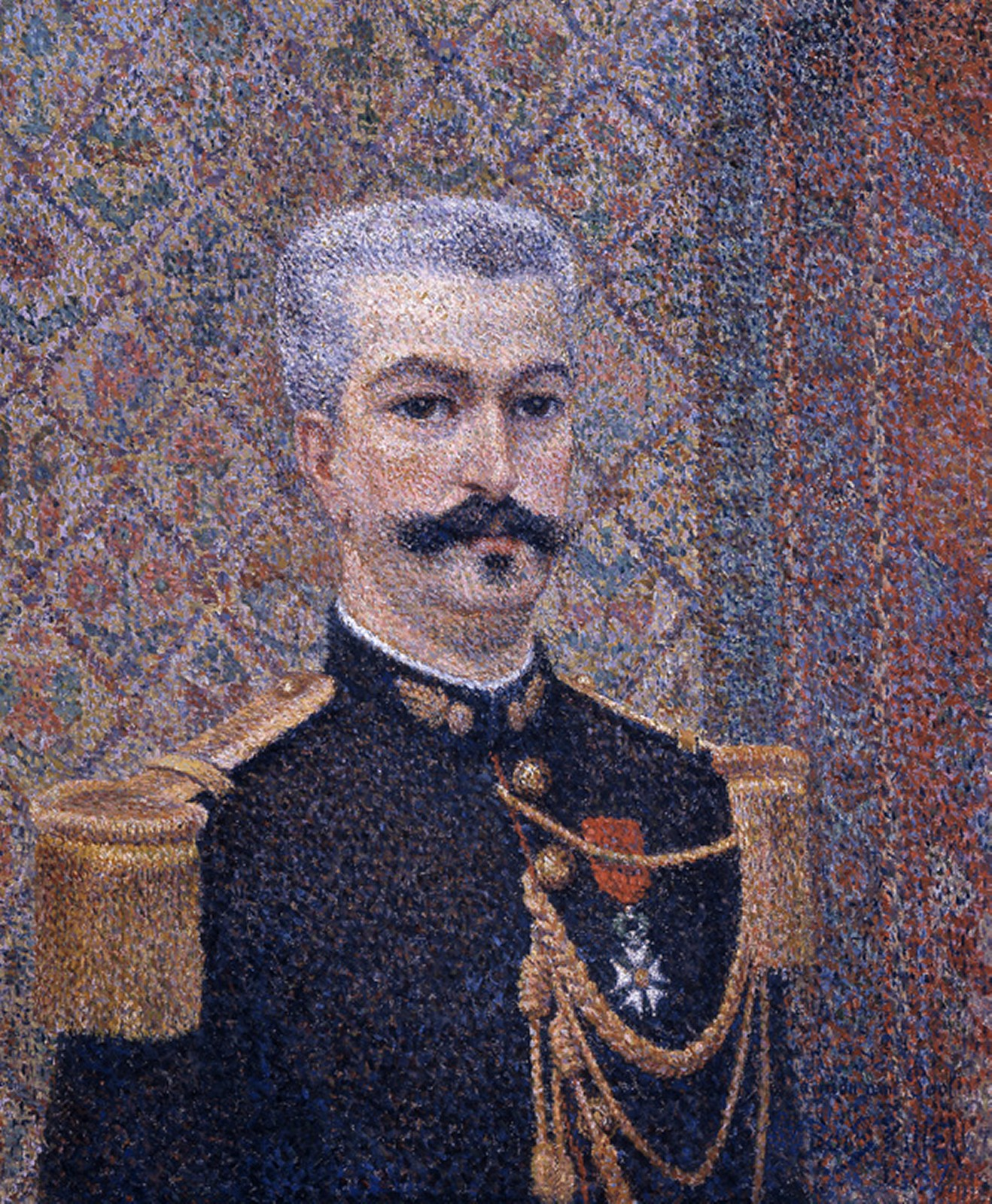
Portrait of Monsieur Pool, 1887

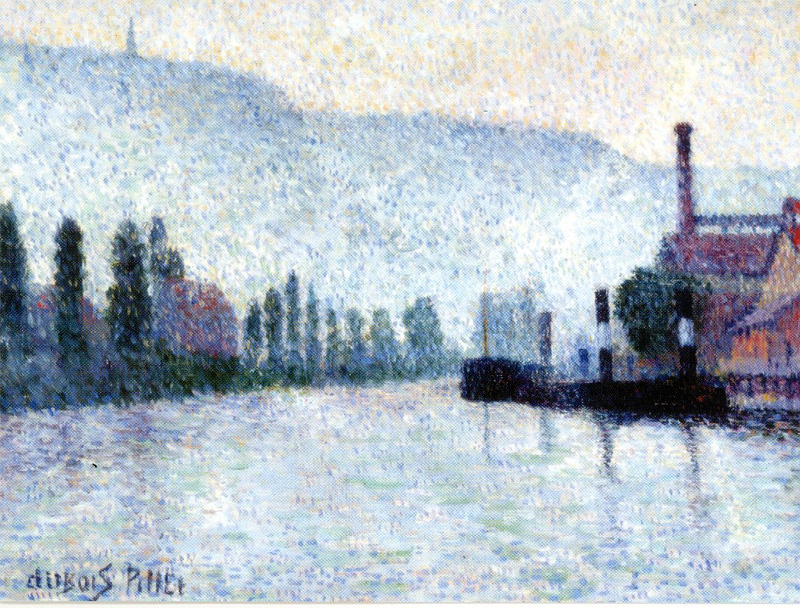
Rouen, La Seine et les Collines à Canteleu, 1887

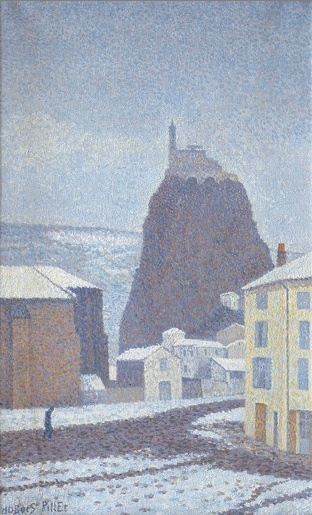
Saint-Michel d'Aiguilhe (Haute-Loire) Under Snow, 1890

== Sources ==
- Clement, Russell T.; Houzé, Annick (1999). Neo-Impressionist Painters: a Sourcebook on Georges Seurat, Camille Pissarro, Paul Signac, Théo Van Rysselberghe, Henri Edmond Cross, Charles Angrand, Maximilien Luce, and Albert Dubois-Pillet. Westport, CT: Greenwood Press. ISBN 0-313-30382-7.
