= Là-bas (novel) =

1891 novel by Joris-Karl Huysmans

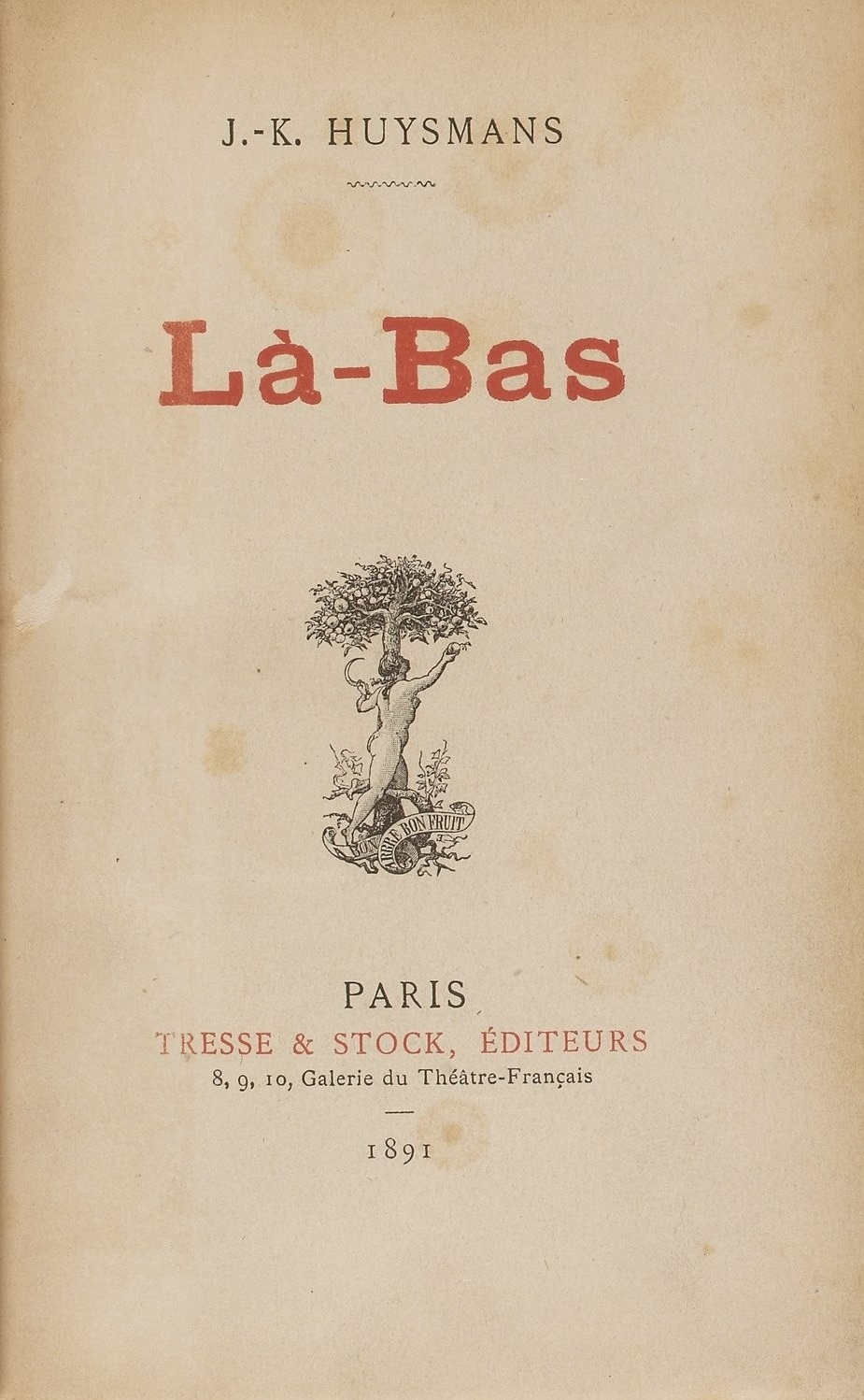
- Title page of the first edition of Là-bas.
- Author: Joris-Karl Huysmans
- Language: French
- Genre: Novel
- Publisher: Tresse & Stock
- Publication date: 1891
- Publication place: France
- Pages: 441

Là-Bas (French pronunciation: [la ba]), translated as Down There or The Damned, is a novel by the French writer Joris-Karl Huysmans, first published in 1891. It is Huysmans's most famous work after À rebours. Là-Bas deals with the subject of Satanism in contemporary France, and the novel stirred controversy on its first appearance. It is the first of Huysmans's books to feature the character Durtal, a thinly disguised portrait of the author himself, who would go on to be the protagonist of Huysmans's subsequent novels En route, La cathédrale and L'oblat.

Là-Bas was translated into English in 1924 by Keene Wallis as Down There, in 2001 by Terry Hale as The Damned, and by Brendan King as Là-Bas.

== History and plot ==
Là-Bas was first published in serial form by the newspaper L'Écho de Paris, with the first installment appearing on February 15, 1891. It came out in book form in April of the same year; the publisher was Tresse et Stock. Many of L'Écho de Paris' more conservative readers were shocked by the subject matter and urged the editor to halt the serialisation, but he ignored them. Sale of the book was prohibited from French railway stations.

The plot of Là-Bas concerns the novelist Durtal, who is disgusted by the emptiness and vulgarity of the modern world. He seeks relief by turning to the study of the Middle Ages (chapter one contains the first critical appreciation of Matthias Grünewald's Tauberbischofsheim altarpiece) and begins to research the life of the notorious 15th-century child-murderer and torturer Gilles de Rais. Through his contacts in Paris (notably Dr. Johannès, modeled after Joseph-Antoine Boullan), Durtal finds out that Satanism is not simply a thing of the past but is alive in fin de siècle France. He embarks on an investigation of the occult underworld with the help of his lover Madame Chantelouve. The novel culminates with a description of a Black Mass.

== Reception ==
Dave Langford reviewed Là-bas for White Dwarf #88, and described it as "A lurid and influential book, containing that famous description of the Black Mass attended by Huysmans himself."

== Adaptations ==
Norman Mailer wrote a screenplay and a short story he adapted from it based on Huysmans's Là-bas entitled Trial of the Warlock. This work was translated into Japanese by Hidekatsu Nojima and published as a book entitled Kuro-Misa (Black Mass) by Shueisha in 1977.

Luis Buñuel and Jean-Claude Carrière wrote a screenplay based on the novel but it was never filmed.

== Sources ==
- Robert Baldick The Life of J.-K. Huysmans (Oxford University Press, 1955; revised by Brendan King, Dedalus, 2006)
- Là-bas: A Journey into the Self, translated by Brendan King (Dedalus, 2001)
- Là-Bas, translated as The Damned by Terry Hale (Penguin Classics, 2001)
