= À vau-l'eau =

1882 novel by Joris-Karl Huysmans

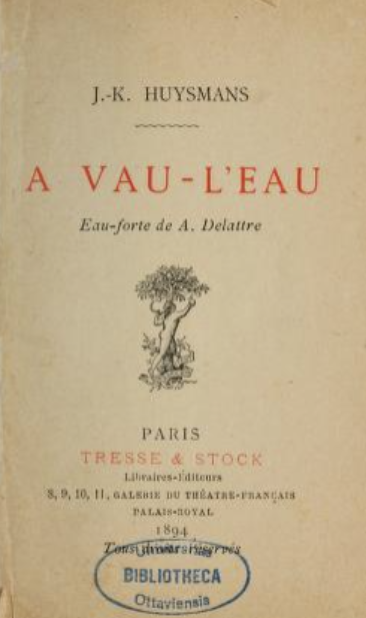
- Title page for À vau-l'eau (1894 edition)
- Author: Joris-Karl Huysmans
- Language: French
- Published: Henry Kistmaeckers, 26 January 1882
- Media type: Novella

À vau-l'eau (English: With the Flow or Downstream or Drifting) is a novella by the French writer Joris-Karl Huysmans, first published by Henry Kistmaeckers in Brussels on January 26, 1882.

== Plot summary ==
The work — which has little in the way of plot — tells the story of Jean Folantin, a downtrodden Parisian civil service clerk whose quest for even a modicum of happiness or material comfort always ends in failure. The book chronicles Folantin's everyday disappointments, typified by his search for a decent meal (there are numerous descriptions of the disgusting food he has to eat). At the end of the novella, Folantin pessimistically resigns himself to give up hope and "go with the flow":

"[H]e realised the futility of changing direction, the sterility of all enthusiasm and all effort. 'You have to let yourself go with the flow; Schopenhauer is right', he told himself, '"Man's life swings like a pendulum between pain and boredom". So there's no point trying to speed up or slow down the rhythm of its swings; all we can do is fold our arms and try to get to sleep....'" (Brown translation, p. 57; in the Baldick translation, p. 68, "go with the flow" is "drift downstream")

À vau-l'eau is a key work in Huysmans' literary development. It is the last book written in the author's early Naturalist style, with its unflinching depiction of sordid everyday reality, but several features point the way forward to the radical departure marked by Huysmans' next — and most famous — novel, À rebours. Huysmans later noted the similarities between Monsieur Folantin and Des Esseintes, the aristocratic hero of À rebours:

I pictured to myself a M. Folantin, more cultured, more refined, more wealthy, than the first, and who has discovered in artificiality a specific for the disgust inspired by the worries of life and the American manners of our time. I imagined him winging his way to the land of dreams ... living alone and apart, far from the present-day world, in an atmosphere suggestive of more cordial epochs and less odious surroundings. (Quoted in the introduction to the Brown translation, p. xii)

In her book, J.-K. Huysmans, Ruth Antosh writes:

M. Folatin has been compared to other literary prototypes of alienation such as Sartre's Roquentin and Camus' Meursault, but he differs from them in that he seems to have deep-seated spiritual longings, though he rejects them as illogical, absurd. (pp. 35-36)

== Translations ==
- As With the Flow by Andrew Brown, with an introduction by Simon Callow (Hesperus, 2003)
- As Downstream by Robert Baldick (reprint edition by Turtle Point Press, 2005)
- As Drifting by Brendan King (Dedalus Books, 2017)

== Sources ==
- Huysmans, J.-K. Romans, Volume One (Bouquins, Robert Laffont, 2005)
- Baldick, Robert, The Life of J.-K. Huysmans (Oxford University Press, 1955; with a foreword and additional notes by Brendan King, Dedalus Press, 2006)
- Antosh, Ruth, J.-K. Huysmans (London: Reaktion Books, 2024)
