= Becalmed =

Becalmed may refer to:

- En rade or Becalmed, an 1887 novel by Joris-Karl Huysmans
- "Becalmed", a song from the Brian Eno album Another Green World
