= The Cathedral (Huysmans novel) =

1898 novel by Joris-Karl Huysmans

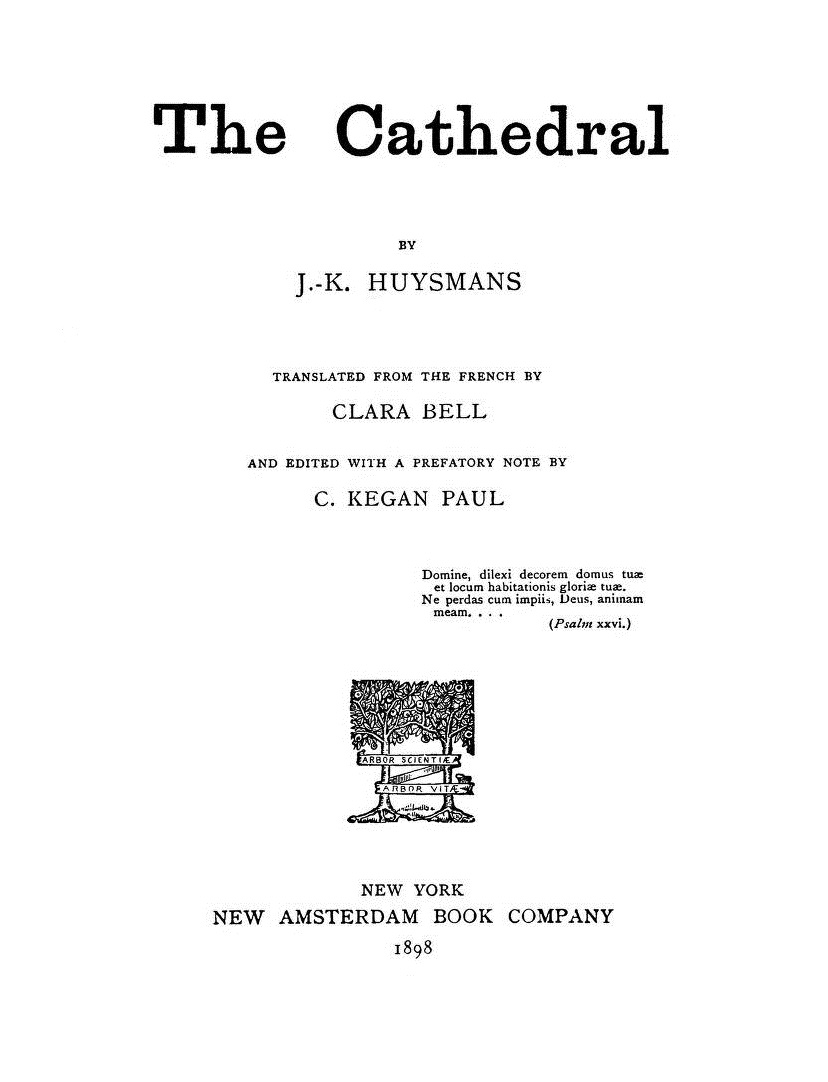
- Title page of the American edition of The Cathedral.
- Author: Joris-Karl Huysmans
- Original title: La Cathédrale
- Language: French
- Genre: Novel
- Publication date: 1898
- Publication place: France
- English publication date: 1898
- Preceded by: En route
- Followed by: The Oblate

The Cathedral (French: La Cathédrale) (1898) is a novel by the French writer Joris-Karl Huysmans. An edition of the 1898 translation with photographs of the cathedral was published in 2011.

It is the third of Huysmans' books to feature the character Durtal, a thinly disguised portrait of the author. He had already featured the character of Durtal in Là-bas and En route, which recounted his conversion to Catholicism. Huysmans' fourth and final novel featuring Durtal was The Oblate, published in 1903.

The Cathedral continues the story. After his retreat at a Trappist monastery, Durtal moves to the city of Chartres, renowned for its Chartres Cathedral. Huysmans describes the building in great detail.

== Publishing history ==
Huysmans first published fourteen extracts from La cathédrale as a serial in the newspaper L'Écho de Paris, beginning on October 27, 1897. The entire novel was published as a book in January 1898. Some commentators questioned the sincerity of the author's religious beliefs, but the novel was the most commercially successful of Huysmans' works during his lifetime. He retired from his job as a civil servant and lived on his royalties.

== Reception ==
The Cathedral was Huysmans' best-selling novel and has been translated into English, most recently in 2011 by Brendan King. Due to its extensive details about the Chartres Cathedral, tourists often use it as a guidebook.

== Sources ==
- Robert Baldick, The Life of J.-K. Huysmans (OUP, 1955; revised edition by Brendan King, Dedalus, 2006)
- The Cathedral translated by Clara Bell (1898). London: Kegan Paul, Trench, Trübner & Co. Published in 2011 by Dedalus Limited with 20 photographs of parts of Chartres Cathedral mentioned in the text.
