= Édouard Dujardin =

French writer

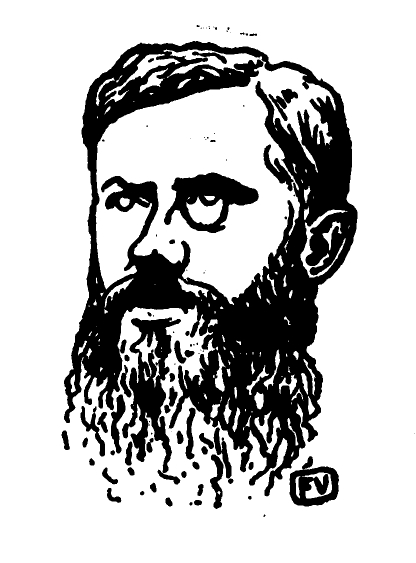
- Portrait of Édouard Dujardin by Félix Vallotton
- Born: 10 November 1861; Saint-Gervais-la-Forêt, France
- Died: 31 October 1949 (aged 87)
- Occupations: Novelist, writer

Édouard Dujardin (French pronunciation: [edwaʁ dyʒaʁdɛ̃]; 10 November 1861 – 31 October 1949) was a French writer, one of the early users of the stream of consciousness literary technique, exemplified by his 1888 novel Les lauriers sont coupés.

== Biography ==
Édouard Émile Louis Dujardin was born in Saint-Gervais-la-Forêt, Loir-et-Cher, and was the only child of Alphonse Dujardin, a sea captain. Stephane Mallarmé described him as "the offspring of an old sea-dog and a Brittany cow". He was educated at the Lycée Pierre Corneille in Rouen.

Dujardin became editor of the journal Revue Indépendante in 1886, and it was in this journal that his first works were published. His association with this journal resulted in it being termed an "important voice for the symbolists" (Harry Ransom Humanities Research Center 2004).

When his parents died, Dujardin was the sole heir to their fortune, and he used some of this money to finance the plays Antonia in 1891 and Le Chevalier Du Passé in 1882.

His literary works are extensive and include numerous plays, poems and novels. Dujardin also produced works of literary and social criticism and reminiscence. James Joyce claimed his style of interior monologue owed its influence to works by Dujardin. He continued his involvement with journalism throughout his life and this resulted in numerous disputes with authorities, including charges of treason, though he was never convicted.

Dujardin had expensive and lavish tastes for clothing which was deemed "dandyish" for his time, and was known to frequent Parisian night life. His many dalliances with women were noted and he had had numerous relationships with actresses, models and other glamorous women. Dujardin was also known to have many female friends involved in the arts and he supported some of them financially.

His frivolous lifestyle eventually reduced his finances so he began numerous financial ventures, including gambling and real estate. He also offered his services to periodicals for marketing and advertising campaigns. It was here that the police noticed an article compiled by Dujardin which resulted in a jail sentence, though it was later remitted.

In 1885 Dujardin and Téodor de Wyzewa initiated the Revue wagnérienne, imitating Félix Fénéon and his Revue Indépendante which had first been published the year before. This annual journal, dedicated to the work of the German composer Richard Wagner, ran for three issues, from 1885 to 1887. In 1886 Dujardin and Fénéon joined forces under the banner of a new improved Revue Indépendante. One of the innovations at this time was that the Revue started having small exhibitions in its rooms.

Dujardin married a woman named Germaine in 1893 and they later separated in 1901. They did not divorce until 1924 when he married Marie Chenou, a woman thirty years his junior. He corresponded frequently with the Irish writer George Moore during a long and enduring friendship.

In May 1922 he attended the International Congress of Progressive Artists and signed the "Founding Proclamation of the Union of Progressive International Artists".

Dujardin was an advocate of the Christ myth theory. He wrote the book Ancient History of the God Jesus (1938). He fathered two children, lived a peaceful life during his old age and died aged 88 years old on 31 October 1949.

== List of works ==
=== Plays ===
- Le Chevalier du passé (1882)
- Antonia (1891)
- Les époux d'Heur-le-Port (1921)

=== Novels and other works ===
- Les lauriers sont coupés (The Bays are Sere) (1888)
- The Source of the Christian Tradition: A Critical History of Ancient Judaism (translated by Joseph McCabe, 1911)
- Interior Monologue
- Mallarmé par un des siens
- Ancient History of the God Jesus (translated by A. Brodie Sanders, 1938)

== References and sources ==
Sources

- George Moore, Letters from George Moore to Ed. Dujardin, 1886–1922, Crosby Gaige, 1929
- Dujardin's papers at the Harry Ransom Humanities Research Center
- Biographical summary (Homonym scientist in French)
