= The Oblate =

1903 novel by Joris-Karl Huysmans

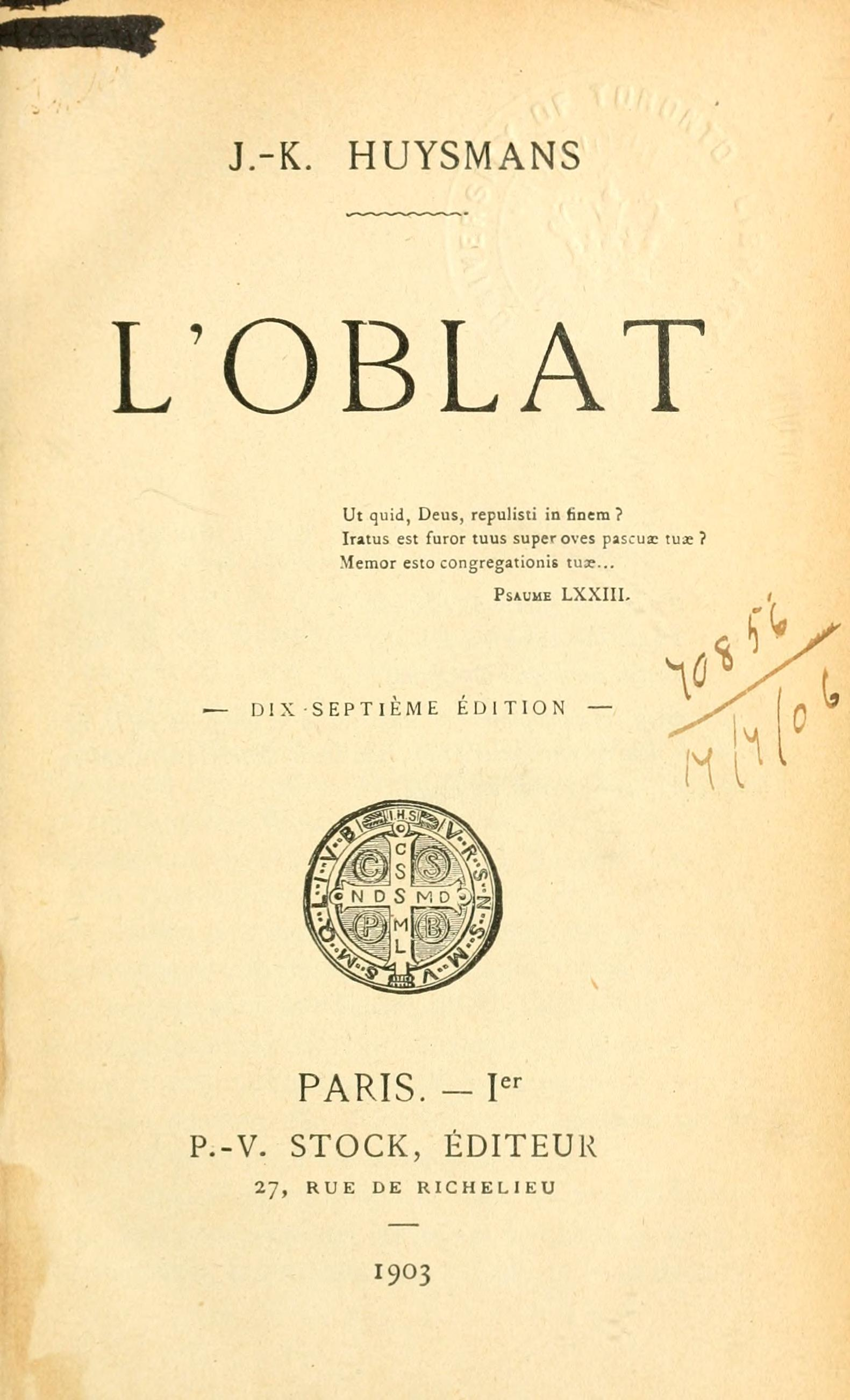
- Title page for L'Oblat (1903)
- Author: Joris-Karl Huysmans
- Original title: L'Oblat
- Working title: The Oblate
- Translator: Edward Perceval
- Language: French
- Publication date: 1903
- Publication place: France
- English publication date: 1924
- Preceded by: The Cathedral

The Oblate (French: L'Oblat) is the last novel by the French writer Joris-Karl Huysmans, first published in 1903.

The Oblate is the final book in Huysmans' cycle of four novels featuring the character Durtal, a thinly disguised portrait of the author himself. Durtal had already appeared in Là-bas, En route and The Cathedral, which traced his (and the author's) conversion to Catholicism.

In The Oblate, Durtal becomes an oblate, reflecting Huysmans' own experiences in the religious community at Ligugé. Like many of Huysmans' other novels, it has little plot. The author uses the book to examine the Christian liturgy, express his opinions about the state of Catholicism in contemporary France and explore the question of suffering.

== Translations ==
- Huysmans, J.-K. The Oblate. Translated by Edward Perceval. London: Kegan Paul, Trench, Trubner & Co.; New York: E. P. Dutton & Co. 1924.
- Huysmans, J.-K. The Oblate. Translated by Brendan King. U. K.: Daedalus. 2023.

== Sources ==
- Baldick, Robert (2006) [1955]. King, Brendan (ed.). The Life of J.-K. Huysmans. Dedalus. ISBN 9781903517437.
