= En rade =

1887 novel by Joris-Karl Huysmans

En Rade
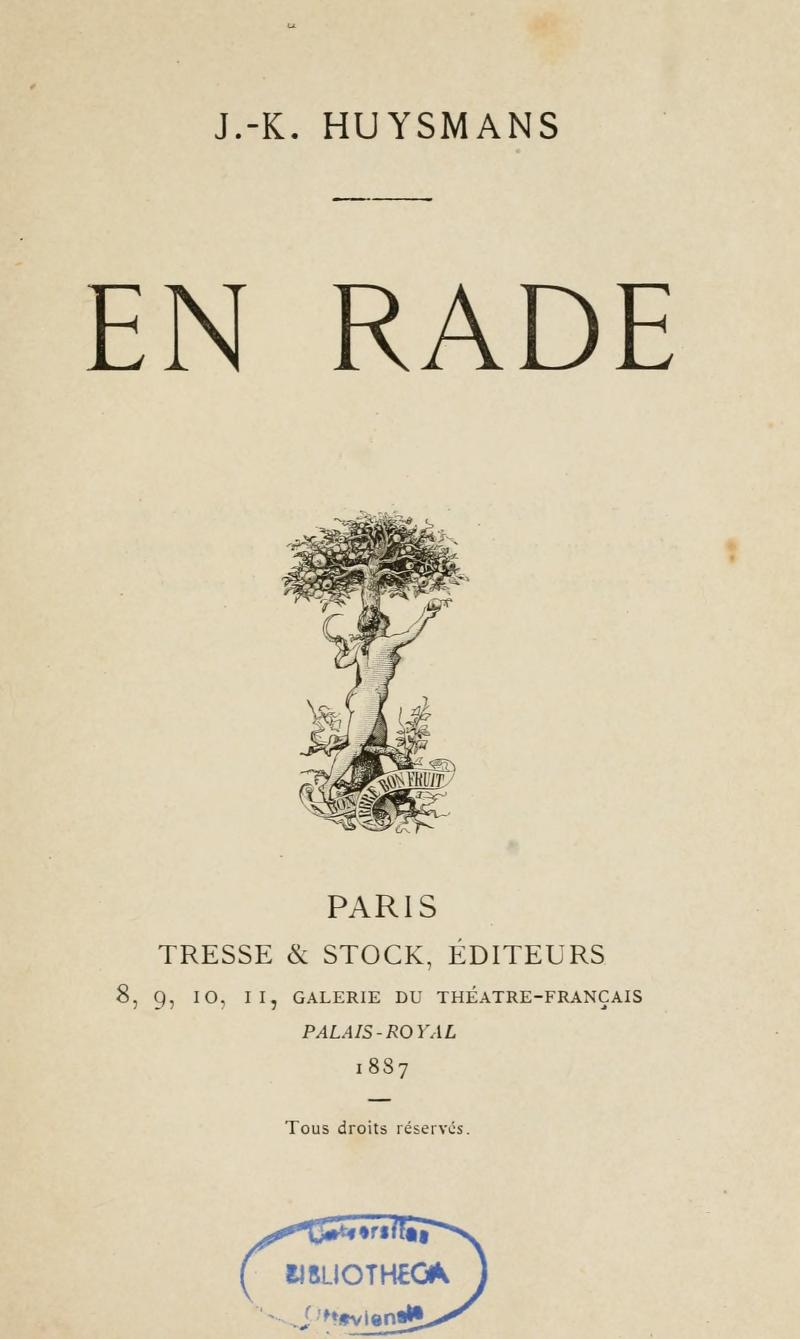
- Title page of the first edition of En Rade.
- Author: Joris-Karl Huysmans
- Language: French
- Genre: Novel
- Publisher: Tresse & Stock
- Publication date: 1887
- Publication place: France
- Pages: 319

En rade (English: Becalmed, A Haven or Stranded) is a novel by the French writer Joris-Karl Huysmans. It first appeared as a serial in the magazine Revue Indépendante between November 1886 and April 1887. It was published in book form on 26 April 1887 by Tresse et Stock. En rade followed Huysmans' most famous novel, À rebours, and was a commercial failure since neither critics nor the public could understand its mixture of brutal realism and fantasy. Later on, the Surrealists were more appreciative and André Breton included extracts from the novel in his Anthology of Black Humour.

== Plot ==
Very little happens in this avowedly anti-Romantic work. Jacques Marles seeks refuge from his Parisian creditors with his wife Louise in a dilapidated bungalow in the village of Longueville, France. Far from finding contentment in an idyllic summer landscape, the couple discover the countryside is grotesque and diseased. The local farmers are greedy, cunning, and obsessed with money. The novel documents the petty irritations and disappointments of the Marleses' day-to-day existence as well as their explorations of the ruined chateau and garden. Interspersed with these realistic descriptions are three dream sequences, recounting Jacques' erotic fantasies in a highly Decadent style.

== Translations ==
- Translated as Becalmed by Terry Hale (Atlas Press, 1992)
- Translated as A Haven in The Decadent Reader, edited by Asti Hustvedt (Zone Press, 1999)
- Translated as Stranded by Brendan King (Dedalus European Classics, 2010)

== Sources ==
- Huysmans Romans Volume One (Bouquins, Robert Laffont, 2005)
- Robert Baldick: The Life of J.-K. Huysmans (originally published by Oxford University Press, 1955; revised by Brendan King, Dedalus Press, 2006)
