= En Route (novel) =

1895 novel by Joris-Karl Huysmans

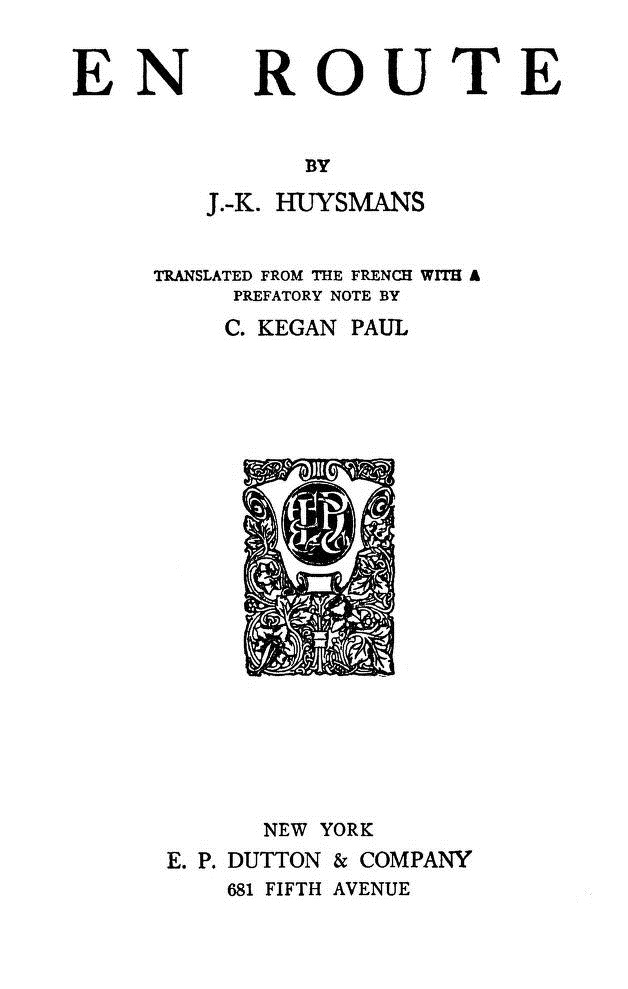
- Title page of the American edition of En Route
- Author: Joris-Karl Huysmans
- Language: French
- Genre: Novel
- Publisher: Tresse & Stock
- Publication date: 1895
- Publication place: France
- Followed by: The Cathedral

En Route is a novel by the French writer Joris-Karl Huysmans and was first published in 1895. It is the second of Huysmans's books to feature the character Durtal, a thinly disguised portrait of the author himself. Durtal had already appeared in Là-bas, investigating Satanism. En Route and the two subsequent two novels, The Cathedral (French: La Cathédrale) and The Oblate (French: L'Oblat), trace his conversion to Catholicism, an experience that reflects the author's own. As Huysmans explained:

"The plot of the novel is as simple as it could be. I've taken the principal character of Là-Bas, Durtal, had him converted, and sent him to a Trappist monastery. In studying his conversion, I've tried to trace the progress of a soul surprised by the gift of grace, and developing in an ecclesiastical atmosphere, to the accompaniment of mystical literature, liturgy, and plainchant, against a background of all that admirable art which the Church has created."

== Translations ==
- Huysmans, J.-K. En Route. Translated by C. Kegan Paul. London: Kegan Paul, Trench, Trubner & Co., 1895. Expurgated.
- Huysmans, J.-K. En Route. Translated by Brendan King. 2024. U. K.: Dedalus.
