= Consuelo (novel) =

1842–43 novel by George Sand

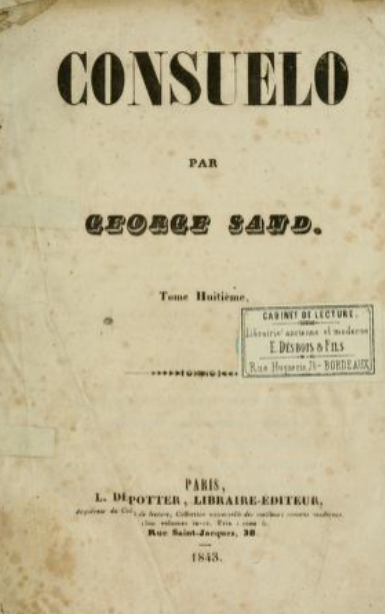
- Title page for Consuelo (1843)
- Author: George Sand
- Language: French
- Publisher: Louis de Potter
- Publication date: 1842–1843
- Publication place: France
- English publication date: 1847

Consuelo is a novel by George Sand, first published serially in 1842–1843 in the Revue indépendante, a periodical founded in 1841 by Sand, Pierre Leroux and Louis Viardot. According to The Nuttall Encyclopædia, it is "[Sand's] masterpiece; the impersonation of the triumph of moral purity over manifold temptations."

The character of Consuelo was supposedly modeled after Louis Viardot's wife, the soprano Pauline Viardot. Pauline Viardot was a good friend of both Sand's and of her lover Frédéric Chopin.

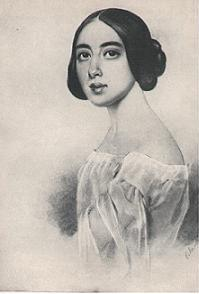
Pauline Viardot, the supposed inspiration for Consuelo

== First sentence ==
«Oui, oui, Mesdemoiselles, hochez la tête tant qu'il vous plaira; la plus sage et la meilleure d'entre vous, c'est ... Mais je ne veux pas le dire; car c'est la seule de ma classe qui ait de la modestie, et je craindrais, en la nommant, de lui faire perdre à l'instant même cette rare vertu que je vous souhaite.... »

"Go on then, young ladies, shake your heads at me, but I'll tell you this... the best behaved and the cleverest girl among you is... — no, I won't tell you who, because she is the only one of my class who has any modesty. I am afraid that if I pointed her out here, she would instantly lose that rare virtue. It is one that I wish the rest of you had more of..." —

== Synopsis ==
Consuelo is a Spanish girl abandoned in Italy whose voice attracts the old maestro Nicola Porpora. Through him she is presented to Count Zustiniani. The latter, after her successful début on the stage, falls in love with her, but is repulsed. When her early lover Angoletto forgets her, Consuelo is sent by Porpora to the home of a German family in Bohemia. Her entrance into this household prepares the way for the sequel, La Comtesse de Rudolstadt (1843).

== Theme ==
Consuelo's adventures continue in La comtesse de Rudolstadt where they take a more philosophical and esoteric dimension. Through all these adventures, Consuelo becomes an untouchable figure of the European artistic landscape of the 18th century thanks to the music and the support of her master, Porpora. The two volumes, Consuelo and La comtesse de Rudolstadt, were edited separately but constitute a single work.

== Posterity ==
After the death of George Sand, many of her novels disappeared into oblivion and her work was quickly reduced to a handful of so-called "country" novels such as La Mare au diable or La Petite Fadette. However, from the 1960s to the 1970s, the rest of Sand's work began to be rediscovered through critical editions, colloquia and scholarly studies. Consuelo was rehabilitated and recognized as one of her masterpieces.

== Theatrical treatments ==
Two operas are based on this novel:

- Consuelo by Alfonso Rendano (1888)
- Consuelo by Giacomo Orefice (1895)
