= Revue indépendante =

French political magazine (1841–1848)

Revue indépendante is a French symbolist journal. The journal was founded in 1841 by George Sand, Pierre Leroux, and Louis Viardot, and is notable for having published such novels as Les Lauriers sont coupés (1887) by Édouard Dujardin, En rade (1886–1887) by Joris-Karl Huysmans, and Consuelo (1842–1843) by George Sand. The magazine is based in Paris. In 1947, it became the official magazine of the Union of Journalists and Writers. Its editor-in-chief is Christian Grégoire. In March 2014, Revue indépendante went online.
