= Téodor de Wyzewa =

French writer, art and music critic, and translator of Polish origin (1862–1917)

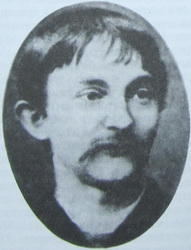

Téodor de Wyzewa, born as Teodor Wyżewski (12 September 1862 – 15 April 1917), was a writer, critic, and translator of Polish descent, born in Kałusik in the Russian sector of Poland near Kamieniec Podolski (Кам'янець-Подільський, Ukraine), who emigrated to France in 1869. He was a leading exponent of Polish origin of the Symbolist movement in France.

With Édouard Dujardin he created La Revue wagnérienne in 1885. In 1901, he founded the Société Mozart with Adolphe Boschot and Georges de Saint-Foix. He frequently contributed articles on European literature and music to the Revue des deux mondes and Le Temps, among many other periodicals. His translation of Jacobus de Voragine's Golden Legend into modern French made it available to a wide audience once more.

Wyzewa made his name with brilliant analyses of poems by Stéphane Mallarmé. In La Revue wagnérienne he put forward the idea of Wagnerian Art which heralded symbolism. He is also famous for his idea of the "work of art of the future", which, according to him, should have been a novel describing only the inner life of its author during a period no longer than a day. The idea, transferred by example of the novel Les lauriers sont coupés by Wyzewa's friend Édouard Dujardin, was fully realized by James Joyce in Ulysses. Wyzewa was critical of Dujardin's novel though.

He was married to Marguerite Terlinden, the daughter of Belgian painter Félix Terlinden and the sister-in-law of the art critic and historian Pierre Francastel. In Ninove (Belgium) there is a field chapel (Ruysbroeck kapel / Ruybroeck kapel) in remembrance of Theodor the Wyzewa's wife, Margareta Ter Linden (1873–1901) and her grand-parents Albrecht Ter Linden (1793–1851) and his wife Isabella Govaert (1801–1875).
