= La Revue wagnérienne =

Defunct French magazine (1885–1888)

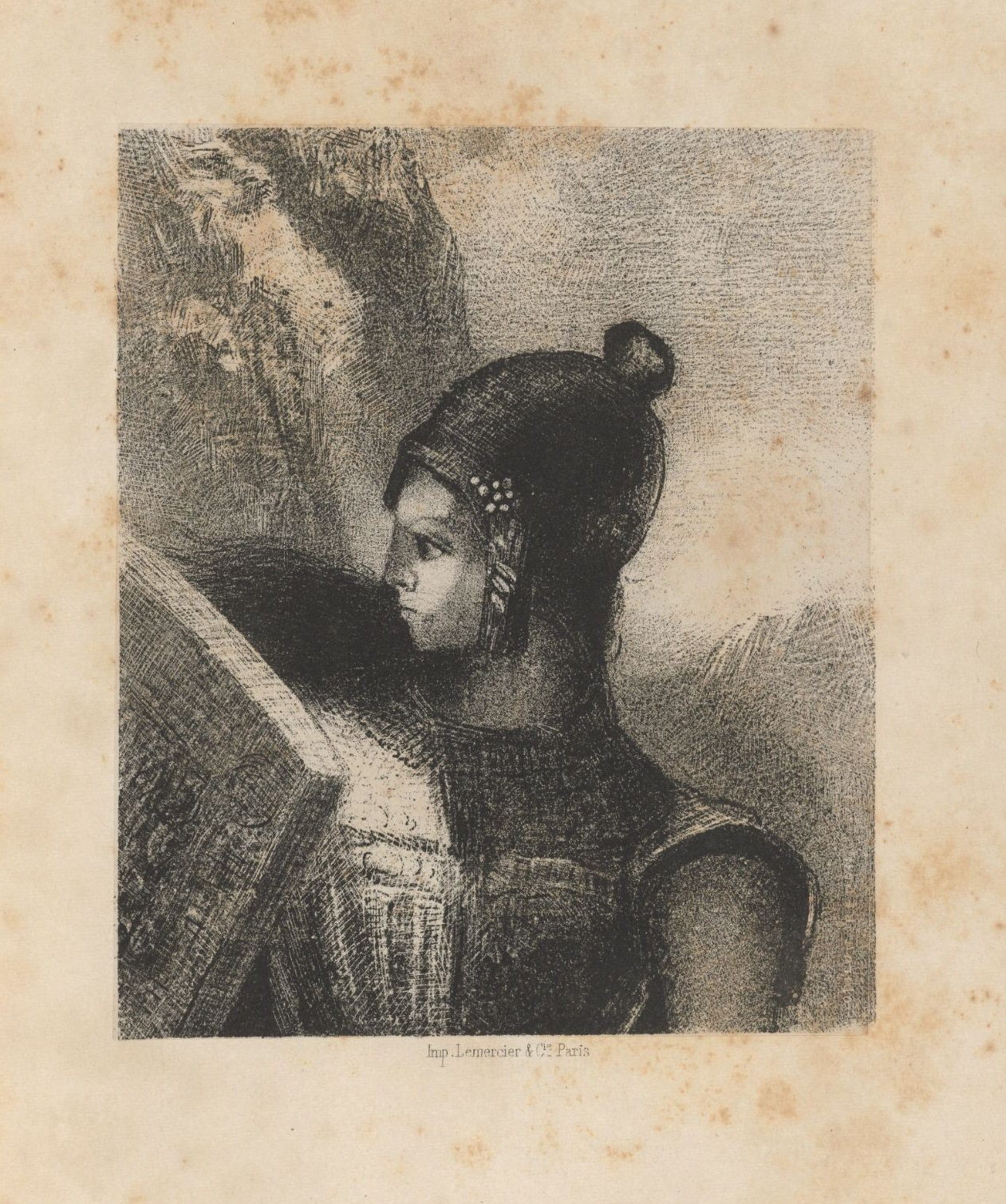
- Brünnhilde, lithography by Odilon Redon. (RW, 8 August 1885)
- Editor: Édouard Dujardin
- Frequency: Bi-monthly
- Founded: February 1885
- Final issue: July 1888
- Country: France
- Based in: Paris
- Language: French
- ISSN: 2022-4540

La Revue wagnérienne was a French magazine covering the artistic and philosophical ideas of German composer Richard Wagner based in Paris, France. It was established by Édouard Dujardin, Téodor de Wyzewa, and Houston Stewart Chamberlain. It was first published in February 1885, and thereafter appeared bimonthly from July 1885 to December 1887. The final issue was published in July 1888. It published concert listings, book reviews, translations of Wagner's writings, reprints of pieces on Wagner, correspondence, as well as original analytical essays dealing with topics relating to Wagner in on average about 30 pages a month.

The magazine was associated with the symbolism arts movement and provided a space for literary criticism, inspired greatly by Charles Baudelaire's interpretation of Wagner's aesthetic theories. Much of the magazine was dedicated to exploring the links between the musical theories of Wagner and symbolism.

== Founding ==
The Revue Wagnérienne was conceived by the young Wagner enthusiasts Edouard Dujardin, Téodor de Wyzewa and Houston Stewart Chamberlain in the summer of Munich 1884, while in attendance of a production of the Ring Cycle. Returning to Paris, Dujardin would host a dinner with key French Wagnerians such as writer Champfleury, translator Victor Wilder and conductor Charles Larmoureux to discuss the feasibility of the project. In the ensuing months, Dujardin secured the financial backing of industrialist Alfred Bovet, Swiss millionaire Agénor Boissier and jurist Arnold Lascoux.

The first edition was sold at the door of the Concerts Lamoureux, a weekly concert series led by conductor and Wagner champion Charles Lamoureux.

== Circulation ==
The publication cost 12 francs a year in France, and 13 Francs abroad. Individual issues were sold for one franc, with deluxe printings on Dutch and Japanese paper available for up to 5 francs annually.

Though exact circulation figures are not available, receipts from printers indicate that each issue received a print run between 600 and 1 000 copies. Despite its small print run, the Revue Wagnérienne is seen by some as the "most substantial and significant expression" of French Wagnerism. The magazine also included "timetables and fares for ferry travel between England and France, suggesting an Anglo-French readership."

Disagreements on the subject of the direction of the publication between the editors vision for La Revue and the financiers eventually led to its demise.

== Content and Contributors ==
While La Revue Wagnérienne included some conventional content such as performance reviews from a number of international correspondents, contributions engaged largely with his aesthetic and philosophical ideas. Rather than musicologist, the key authors came from literary circles. Contributors included poets Stephane Mallarmé, Algernon Charles Swinburne, Paul Verlaine and Joris-Karl Huysmans. who were largely associated with the symbolism movement, and to a lesser extent, decadent movement. The publication also featured lithographs from Henri Fantin-Latour, which helped establish his 'reputation as an antinaturalist painter-printmaker,' symbolist Odilon Redon, and Jaques-Émile Blanche.

Due to the relative scarcity of full Wagner performances within contemporary Paris, many contributors had limited exposure to the music itself and largely based their analysis on Wagner's prose output. As such, the Revue was not always well received, with one commenter saying that it produced 'neither good art nor competent criticism.' Still, Pamela Genova argues that because of the "unusual blend it presents of divergent methodologies and formats, its balance between detailed theoretical pieces and an informal and informative style of journalistic' marks an important example of literary journalism.

Though la Revue is principally known for its association with symbolism, contributions were often eclectic in nature, linking Wagner's music and ideas to such diverse topics as Christianity, evolution and socialism. It also featured French translation of several of Wagner's prose works, such as "Une Capitulation" and "Beethoven."
