= Marthe (novel) =

1876 novel by Joris-Karl Huysmans

Marthe, histoire d'une fille (English: Marthe, the Story of a Girl — where "girl" implies "prostitute" ) was the first novel by the French writer Joris-Karl Huysmans, published in 1876.

The book is autobiographical in inspiration and tells the story of the love affair between a young journalist called Léo and the heroine of the title, a would-be actress who had worked in a factory for artificial pearls as well as in a licensed brothel. The love affair breaks up and Marthe goes to live with the alcoholic actor-manager Ginginet. After his death, she is reduced to living on the streets. Huysmans was worried about the response to the book's controversial subject matter, since the author Jean Richepin had recently been imprisoned for a month and fined for writing a book on the theme of prostitution. In spite of this, Marthe is not pornographic. Huysmans intended its squalid realism as an attack on the overidealised view of bohemian life in Paris he found in such Romantic writers as Henri Murger, whose famous Scènes de la vie bohème had appeared in 1848. Huysmans' style in Marthe owes a great deal to his literary hero at the time, Edmond de Goncourt.

To avoid prosecution, Huysmans travelled to Brussels to have Marthe issued by the Belgian publisher Jean Gay, who had considerable experience smuggling contraband books across the French border. The novel appeared for sale in Belgium on October 1, 1876. Huysmans decided against smuggling it into France but when he attempted to take 400 copies through French customs, all but a handful were impounded. Huysmans decided to send some of the few remaining copies to leading figures of the literary scene in Paris. Edmond de Goncourt offered qualified praise but Émile Zola was most enthusiastic. Zola, the head of the new Naturalist school of French fiction, soon became a friend and mentor to the young Huysmans, whose association with the Naturalist group would last until his most famous novel, A rebours (1884), took Huysmans' writing in a completely different direction.

== Translations ==
- Marthe: The Story of a Woman, translated by Samuel Putnam "with scenes from her life by Toulouse-Lautrec" (Lear Publishers, 1948). First published by Pascal Covici, 1927.
- Marthe, translated by Brendan King (Dedalus, 2006).

== Sources ==
- Huysmans Romans Volume One (Bouquins, Robert Laffont, 2005)
- Robert Baldick: The Life of J.-K. Huysmans (originally published by Oxford University Press, 1955; revised by Brendan King, Dedalus Press, 2006)
