= Joris-Karl Huysmans =

French novelist and art critic (1848–1907)

Joris–Karl Huysmans
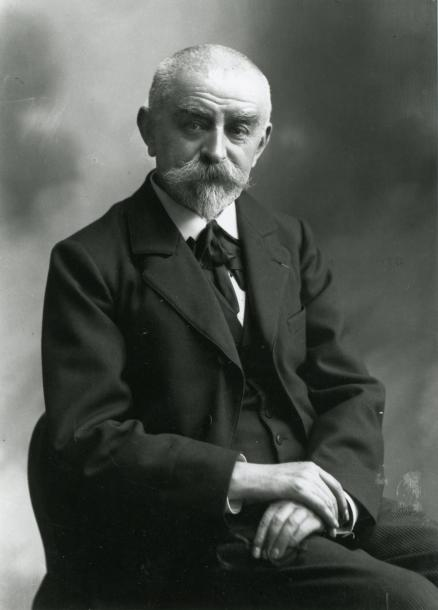
- Huysmans, c. 1904
- Born: Charles-Marie-Georges Huysmans; 5 February 1848; Paris, July Monarchy
- Died: 12 May 1907 (aged 59); Paris, Third French Republic
- Occupation: Novelist
- Writing career
- Notable works: À rebours (1884); Là-bas (1891); En route (1895); La cathédrale (1898)
- Movements: Naturalist; Decadent

Signature
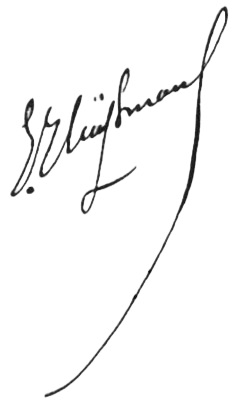

Charles-Marie-Georges Huysmans (US: /wiːsˈmɒ̃s/, French: [ʃaʁl maʁi ʒɔʁʒ ɥismɑ̃s]; 5 February 1848 – 12 May 1907) was a French novelist and art critic who published his works as Joris-Karl Huysmans (French: [ʒɔʁis kaʁl -], abbreviated as J. K. or J.-K.). He is most famous for the novel À rebours (1884, published in English as Against the Grain and as Against Nature). He supported himself by way of a 30-year career in the French civil service.

Huysmans's work is considered remarkable for its idiosyncratic use of the French language, large vocabulary, descriptions, satirical wit and far-ranging erudition. First considered part of Naturalism, he became associated with the Decadent movement with his publication of À rebours. His work expressed his deep pessimism, which had led him to the philosophy of Arthur Schopenhauer. In later years, his novels reflected his study of Catholicism, religious conversion, and becoming an oblate. He discussed the iconography of Christian architecture at length in La cathédrale (1898), set at Chartres and with its cathedral as the focus of the book.

Huysmans' novel Là-bas (1891) concerns the novelist Durtal, who researches Satanism and the 15th-century child-murderer Gilles de Rais. It was followed by the Durtal trilogy, comprising En route (1895), La cathédrale (1898), and L'Oblat (1903), in which Durtal takes a spiritual journey and eventually converts to Catholicism; in L'Oblat, he becomes an oblate in a monastery, as Huysmans himself was in the Benedictine Abbey at Ligugé, near Poitiers, in 1901. La cathédrale was his most commercially successful work. Its profits enabled Huysmans to retire from his civil service job and live on his royalties.

== Biography ==
=== Early life ===
Huysmans was born in Paris, France, in 1848. "His young mother, Élisabeth-Malvina Badin Huysmans, had been a schoolteacher before she married, and his father, Victor-Godfried-Jan Huysmans [Dutch: Huijsmans], was a Dutch immigrant who worked in Paris as a commercial artist." Huysmans's father (1815-1856) died when Huysmans was eight years old. Constant Cornelis Huijsmans, the Dutch painter and art teacher (including of Vincent van Gogh), was his uncle. Huysmans mother quickly remarried, and Huysmans resented his stepfather, Jules Og, a Protestant who, with Huysmans's mother, purchased a bookbindery on the ground floor of the building where they lived.

During his childhood, Huysmans turned away from the Roman Catholic Church. He was unhappy at school but completed his coursework and earned a baccalauréat.

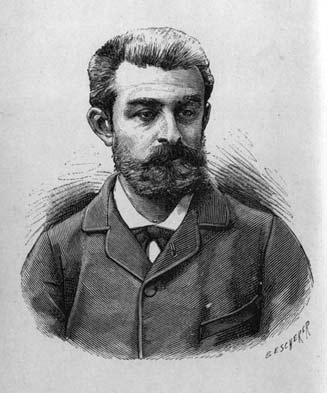
Portray of Huysmans by Louis Félix Beschere (1886)

=== Civil service career ===
For 32 years, Huysmans worked as a civil servant for the French Ministry of the Interior, a job he found tedious. The young Huysmans was called up to fight in the Franco-Prussian War, but was invalided out with dysentery. He used this experience in an early story, "Sac au dos" (Backpack) (later included in his collection, Les Soirées de Médan).

After his retirement from the Ministry in 1898, made possible by the commercial success of his novel, La cathédrale, Huysmans planned to leave Paris and move to Ligugé. He intended to set up a community of Catholic artists, including Charles-Marie Dulac (1862-1898). He had praised the young painter in La cathédrale. Dulac died a few months before Huysmans completed his arrangements for the move to Ligugé, and he decided to stay in Paris.

In 1905 Huysmans was diagnosed with cancer of the mouth. He died in 1907 and was interred in the cimetière du Montparnasse, Paris.

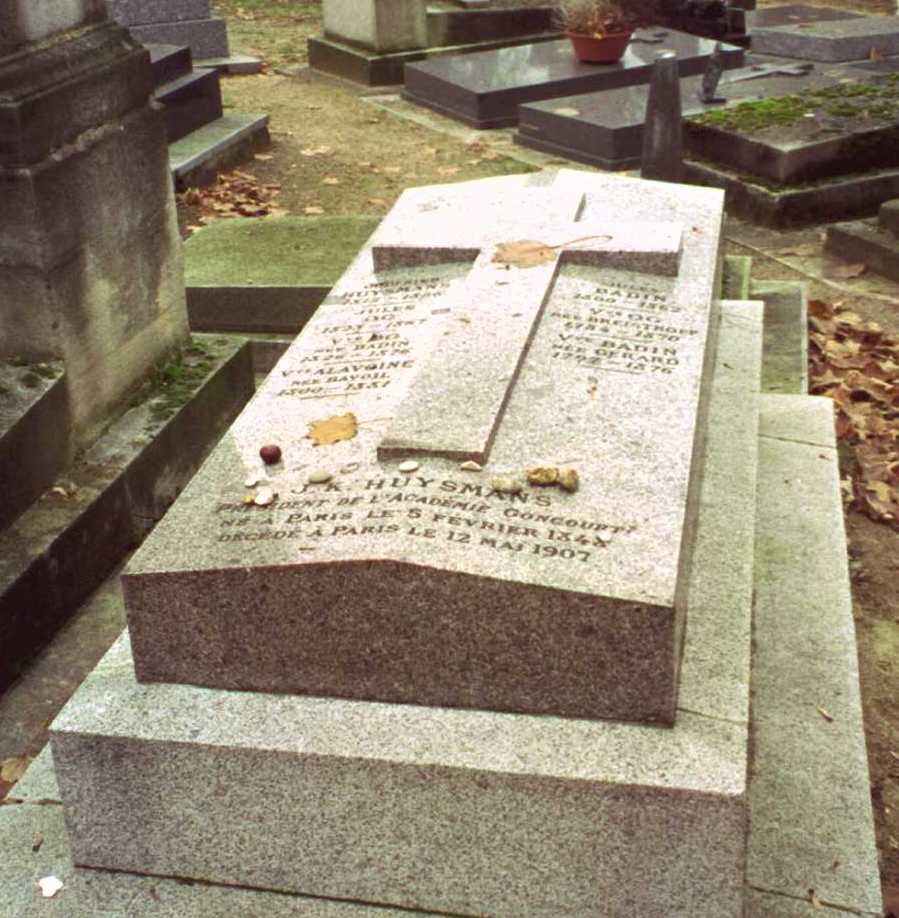
Huysmans's grave

=== Writing career ===
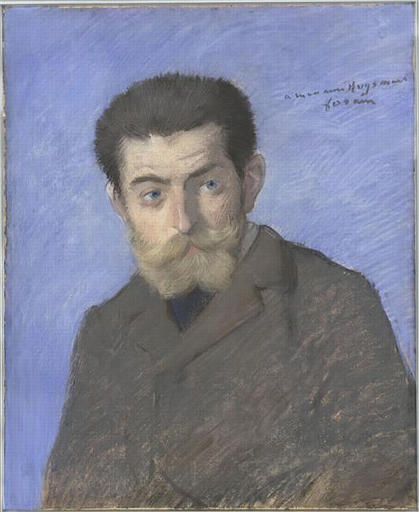
A portrait of Huysmans, by Jean-Louis Forain, c. 1878 (Musée d'Orsay)

He used the name Joris-Karl Huysmans when he published his writing, as a way of honoring his father's ancestry. His first major publication was a collection of prose poems, Le drageoir aux épices (1874), which were strongly influenced by Baudelaire. They attracted little attention but revealed flashes of the author's distinctive style.

Huysmans followed it with the novel, Marthe, Histoire d'une fille (1876). The story of a young prostitute, it was closer to Naturalism and brought him to the attention of Émile Zola. His next works were similar: sombre, realistic and filled with detailed evocations of Paris, a city Huysmans knew intimately. Les Sœurs Vatard (1879), dedicated to Zola, deals with the lives of women in a bookbindery. En ménage (1881) is an account of a writer's failed marriage. The climax of his early work is the novella À vau-l'eau (1882) (translated as With the Flow, Downstream, and Drifting), the story of a downtrodden clerk, Monsieur Folantin, and his quest for a decent meal.

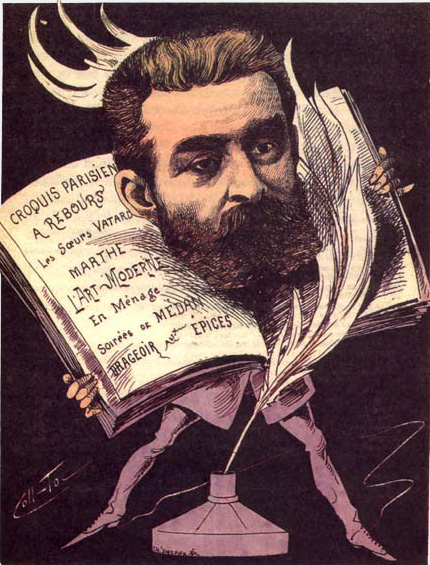
A caricature showing Huysmans as a somewhat eccentric sort of literary dandy, by Coll-Toc, 1885

Huysmans's 1884 novel À rebours (Against the Grain or Against Nature) became his most famous, or notorious. It featured the character of an aesthete, des Esseintes, and decisively broke from Naturalism. It was seen as an example of "decadent" literature. The description of des Esseintes's "alluring liaison" with a "cherry-lipped youth" was believed to have influenced other writers of the decadent movement, including Oscar Wilde.

Huysmans began to drift away from the Naturalists and found new friends among the Symbolist and Catholic writers whose work he had praised in À rebours. They included Jules Barbey d'Aurevilly, Villiers de L'Isle Adam, and Léon Bloy. Stéphane Mallarmé was so pleased with the publicity his verse had received from the novel that he dedicated one of his most famous poems, "Prose pour des Esseintes", to its hero. Barbey d'Aurevilly told Huysmans that after writing À rebours, he would have to choose between "the muzzle of a pistol and the foot of the Cross." Huysmans, who had received a secular education and abandoned his Catholic religion in childhood, returned to the Catholic Church eight years later.

Huysmans's next book after Á rebours was the novella Un dilemme, which tells "the story of a poor working-class woman who gives birth out of wedlock. When her bourgeois lover, the father of the baby, dies, his heartless family members refuse to help, leaving the mother and her child destitute." Huysmans's next novel, En rade, an unromantic account of a summer spent in the country, did not sell as well as its predecessor. "The novel's originality lies in its abrupt juxtaposition of real life and dreams."

His Là-bas (1891) attracted considerable attention for its portrayal of Satanism in France in the late 1880s. He introduced the character Durtal, a thinly disguised self-portrait, who is writing a biography of the notorious 15th-century child-murderer and torturer Gilles de Rais. The later Durtal novels, En route (1895), La cathédrale (1898) and L'oblat (1903), explore Durtal/Huysmans's conversion to Roman Catholicism. En route depicts Durtal's spiritual struggle during his stay at a Trappist monastery. In La cathédrale (1898), the protagonist is at Chartres, intensely studying the cathedral and its symbolism. The commercial success of this book enabled Huysmans to retire from the civil service and live on his royalties. In L'Oblat, Durtal becomes a Benedictine oblate. He finally learns to accept the world's suffering.

Huysmans was a founding member of the Académie Goncourt.

Huysmans's work was known for his idiosyncratic use of the French language, extensive vocabulary, detailed and sensuous descriptions, and biting, satirical wit. It also displays an encyclopaedic erudition, ranging from the catalogue of decadent Latin authors in À rebours to the discussion of the iconography of Christian architecture in La cathédrale. Huysmans expresses a disgust with modern life and a deep pessimism. This had led him first to the philosophy of Arthur Schopenhauer. Later he returned to the Catholic Church, as he described in his Durtal novels.

=== Art criticism ===
In addition to his novels, Huysmans was known for his art criticism, collected in his books L'Art Moderne (1883) and Certains (1889), both recently translated into English by Brendan King. In 1905, Huysmans published his third and last book on art, "Trois primitifs ('Three Primitive Painters'), his studies of Matthias Grünewald, the 'Master of Flémalle' (now generally considered to be Robert Campin), and the unknown artist of a painting in the Frankfurt Museum."

Huysmans "was a perceptive and talented art critic who was among the first to recognize the genius of Degas and the Impressionists." Huysmans became so associated with the Impressionists "that one critic, the journalist Félix Fénéon, referred to Huysmans as 'the inventor of impressionism.'" Robert Baldick wrote:

Huysmans' great achievement as an art-critic was, of course, his staunch championship of the Impressionists. . . . [P]osterity has ratified nearly all his critical judgements on the Impressionists themselves. He did more than any other man to establish their reputations.

But after Huysmans sent a copy of L'Art Moderne to Camille Pissarro, Pissarro wrote to him, "How is it that you don't say one word about Cézanne, whom not one of us has failed to acknowledge as one of the most singular temperaments of our time, and one who has had a very great influence on modern art? I was extremely surprised by your articles on Monet. How can such astonishing vision, such phenomenal execution and such rare and extensive decorative feeling not have struck you back in 1870 ...?"

== Style and influence ==
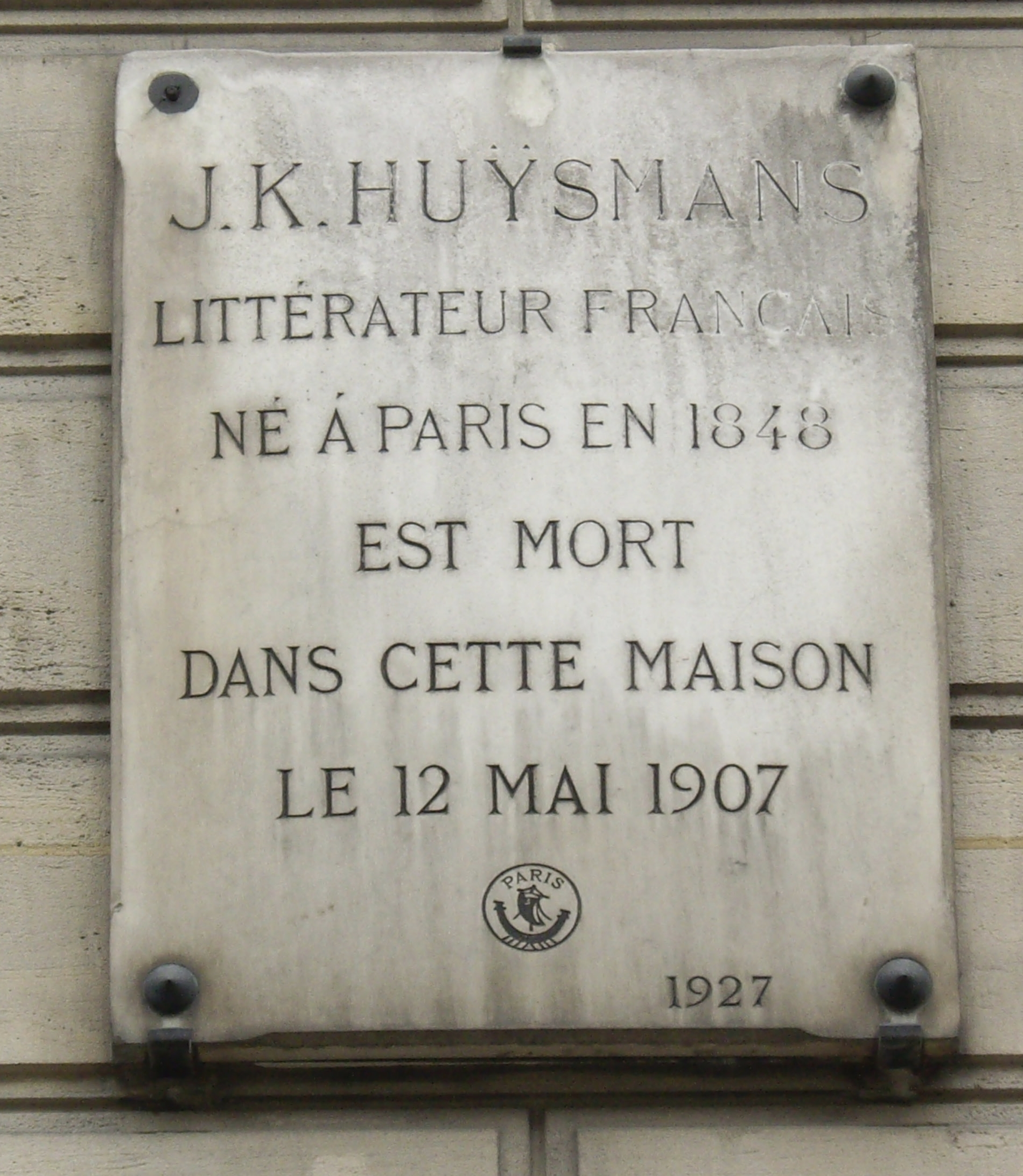
Commemorative plaque in 31 rue Saint-Placide, Paris, 6e

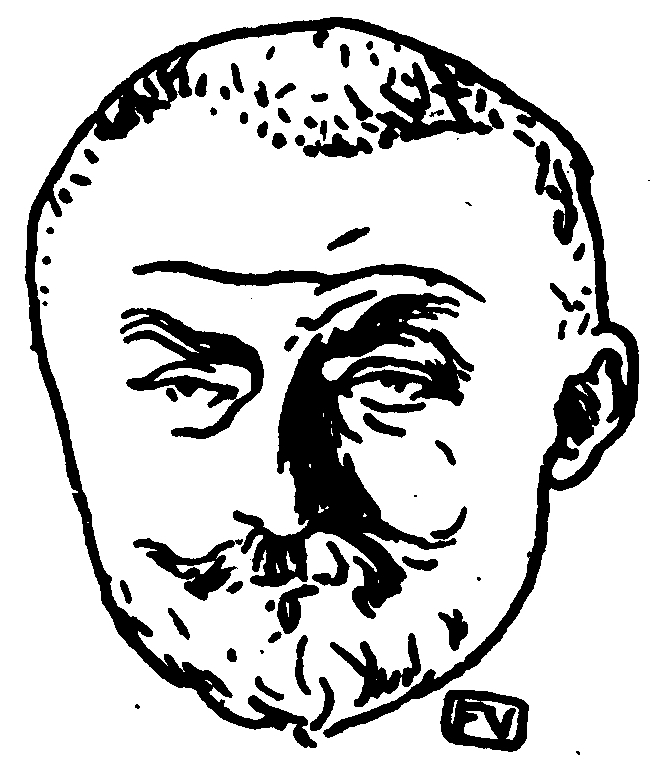
A caricature of Huysmans, by Félix Vallotton, c. 1898

"It takes me two years to 'document' myself for a novel – two years of hard work. That is the trouble with the naturalistic novel – it requires so much documentary care. I never make, like Zola, a plan for a book. I know how it will begin and how it will end – that's all. When I finally get to writing it, it goes along rather fast – assez vite."

"Barbaric in its profusion, violent in its emphasis, wearying in its splendor, it is — especially in regard to things seen – extraordinarily expressive, with all the shades of a painter's palette. Elaborately and deliberately perverse, it is in its very perversity that Huysmans's work — so fascinating, so repellent, so instinctively artificial — comes to represent, as the work of no other writer can be said to do, the main tendencies, the chief results, of the Decadent movement in literature." (Arthur Symons, The Decadent Movement in Literature)

"Continually dragging Mother Image by the hair or the feet down the worm-eaten staircase of terrified Syntax." (Léon Bloy, quoted in Robert Baldick, The Life of J.-K. Huysmans). Critical reviews by Léon Bloy of À rebours, En rade, and Là-bas published contemporaneously, in various journals or reviews, as Huysmans's novels came out over the years, in 1884, 1887, 1891, can be found, collected and published six years after Huysmans's death, in book form, in On Huysmans' Tomb.

"It is difficult to find a writer whose vocabulary is so extensive, so constantly surprising, so sharp and yet so exquisitely gamey in flavour, so constantly lucky in its chance finds and in its very inventiveness." (Julien Gracq)

"In short, he kicks the oedipal to the curb" (M. Quaine, Heirs and Graces, 1932, Jowett / Arcana)

Huysmans's novel, Against the Grain, has more discussions of sound, smell, and taste than perhaps any other work of literature. For example, one chapter consists entirely of smell hallucinations so vivid that they exhaust the book's central character, Des Esseintes, a bizarre, depraved aristocrat. A student of the perfumer's art, Esseintes has developed several devices for titillating his jaded senses. Besides special instruments for re-creating any conceivable odour, he has constructed a special "mouth organ" designed to stimulate his palate rather than his ears. The organ's regular pipes have been replaced by rows of little barrels, each containing a different liqueur. In Esseintes's mind, the taste of each liqueur corresponded to the sound of a particular instrument:

"Dry curaçao, for example, was like the clarinet, with its penetrating and velvety note: kümmel matched the oboe with its sonorous nasal resonance; menthe and anisette were like the flute, at once honeyed and peppery, whimpering but muted; whereas kirsch, to complete the orchestra, is a wild trumpet blast; gin and whisky assault the palate with the strident blare of their cornets and trombones; marc-brandy raises the roof with its deafening hubbub of tubas."

By experimentation, Esseintes learned to "execute on his tongue a succession of voiceless melodies; noiseless funeral marches, solemn and stately; could hear in his mouth solos of crème de menthe, duets of vespertro and rum."

The protagonist of Submission (2015), a novel by Michel Houellebecq, is a literary scholar specializing in Huysmans and his work; Huysmans's relation to Catholicism serves as a foil for the book's treatment of Islam in France.

== Personal life ==
Huysmans never married or had children. He had a long-term, on-and-off relationship with Anna Meunier, a seamstress.

Huysmans was made a Chevalier de la Légion d'honneur in 1892 for his work with the civil service. In 1905, his admirers persuaded the French government to promote him to Officier de la Légion d'honneur for his literary achievements.

== Works ==
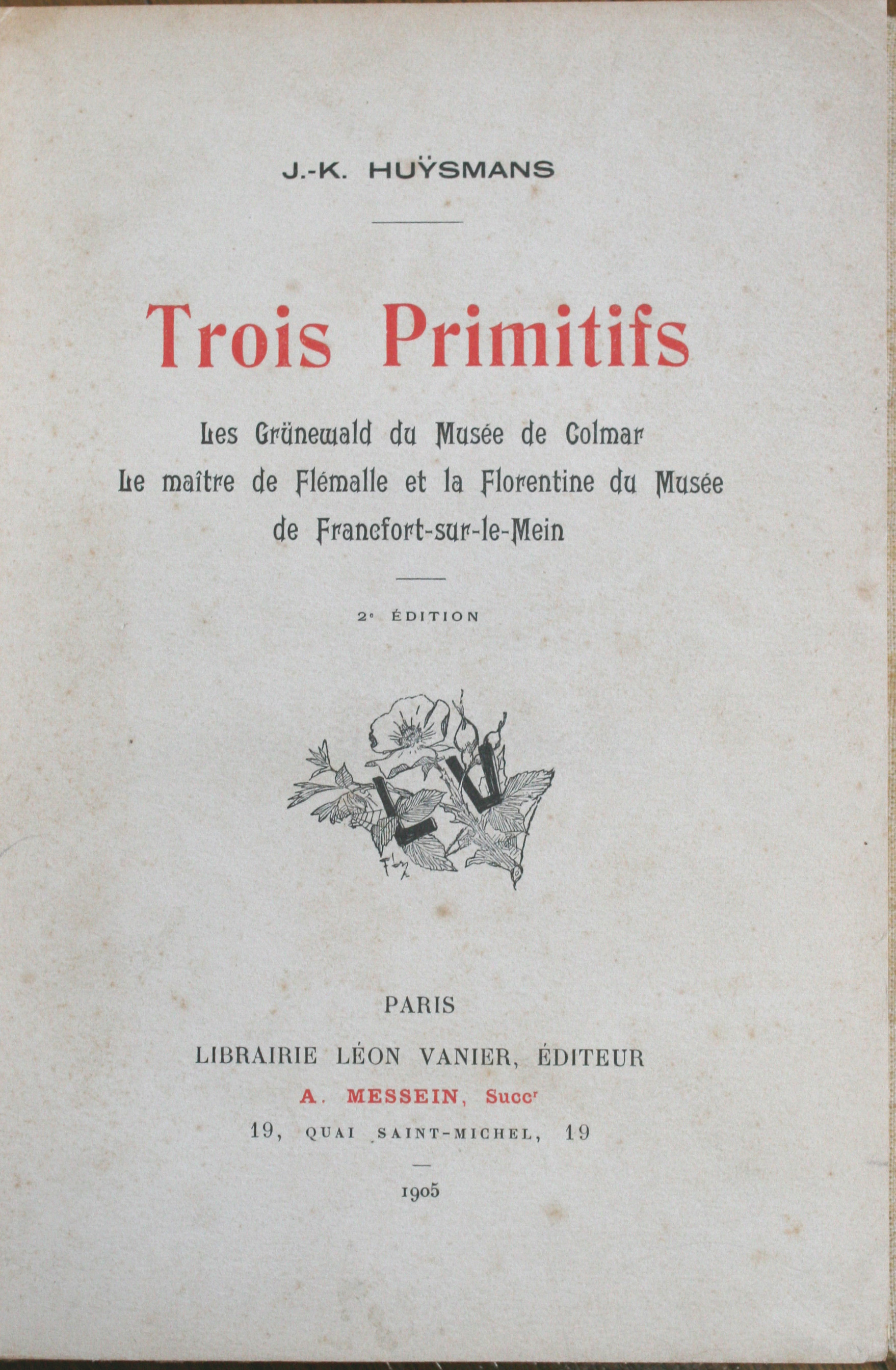
Cover of Trois Primitifs (1905)

- Le drageoir aux épices (1874). Translated by Paul Oldfield in 2005 as A Dish of Spices. Robert Baldick described it as "a collection of prose-poems in the manner of Baudelaire and Aloysius Bertrand".
- Marthe, Histoire d'une fille (1876). Huysmans' first novel.
- Sac au dos (published in L'Artiste in 1876 and in a revised version in 1880 in Les Soirées de Médan). Translated in 2018 as Knapsacks; 1907 translation online. Based on Huysmans' experience in the military.
- Les Soeurs Vatard (1879). Translated by Brendan King in 2012 as The Vatard Sisters.
- Croquis Parisiens (1880, 2nd ed. 1886). Translated by Brendan King in 2004 as Parisian Sketches; published by Dedalus.
- En ménage (1881). Translated by George MacLennan in 2025 as Domesticity.
- Pierrot Sceptique: Pantomime (1881, written in collaboration with Léon Hennique)
- À vau-l'eau (1882)
- L'art moderne (1883). Translated in 2019 as Modern Art.
- À rebours (1884)
- Un Dilemme (1887). Translated in 2015 by Justin Vicari as A Dilemma.
- En rade (1887)
- Certains (1889). Translated in 2021 as Certain Artists.
- La bièvre (1890)
- Là-bas (1891)
- En route (1895). Translated in 2024 as En Route.
- La cathédrale (1898)
- La Bièvre et Saint-Séverin (1898)
- La magie en Poitou. Gilles de Rais. (1899)
- La Bièvre; Les Gobelins; Saint-Séverin (1901)
- Sainte Lydwine de Schiedam (1901). Translated in 1923 by Agnes Hastings as Saint Lydwine of Schiedam London: Kegan Paul, Trench, Trubner & Co., Ltd.; New York: E. P. Dutton & Co. (Nihil Obstat and Imprimatur)
- De Tout (1902)
- Esquisse biographique sur Don Bosco (1902)
- L'Oblat (1903). Translated in 2023 as The Oblate.
- Trois Primitifs (1905)
- Le Quartier Notre-Dame (1905)
- Les foules de Lourdes (1906)
- Trois Églises et trois Primitifs (1908)

Current editions:

- Écrits sur l’art (1867-1905), edited and introduced by Patrice Locmant, Paris, Éditions Bartillat, 2006.
- À Paris, edited and introduced by Patrice Locmant, Paris, Éditions Bartillat, 2005.
- Les Églises de Paris, edited and introduced by Patrice Locmant, Paris, Éditions de Paris, 2005.
- Le Drageoir aux épices, edited and introduced by Patrice Locmant, Paris, Honoré Champion, 2003.
- The Durtal Trilogy, edited by Joseph Saint-George with notes by Smithbridge Sharpe, Google Books Ex Fontibus Company, 2016 These are the original English translations, with annotations added.

== See also ==
- Léon Bloy
- Joseph-Antoine Boullan
- Stanislas de Guaita
- Henri Antoine Jules-Bois
- Joséphin Péladan
- Our Lady of La Salette
- Oscar Wilde
