= Robert Baldick =

British scholar and translator (1927–1972)

Robert André Edouard Baldick, FRSL (9 November 1927 – April 24, 1972), was a British scholar of French literature, writer, translator and joint editor of the Penguin Classics series with Betty Radice. He was a Fellow of Pembroke College, Oxford.

He wrote eight books, including biographies of Joris-Karl Huysmans, Frédérick Lemaître, and Henry Murger, and a history of the Siege of Paris. In addition, he edited and translated Pages from the Goncourt Journals and other classics of French literature, including Gustave Flaubert's Sentimental Education, Jules Verne's Journey to the Centre of the Earth, and Jean-Paul Sartre's Nausea, as well as works by Chateaubriand and Henri Barbusse and a number of novels by Georges Simenon. In The New Criterion, Eric Ormsby writes that Baldick's The Life of J.-K. Husymans is "able to hold its own with Painter's Proust or Ellman's Joyce".

Baldick died unexpectedly of a cerebral tumor at age 44. His sons are Julian Baldick, an author specialising in Sufism, and the English academic Chris Baldick.

== Selected bibliography ==
- The Life of J.-K. Huysmans. (Oxford University Press, 1955; new edition, revised by Brendan King, Dedalus Books 2006)
- Dinner at Magny's (Victor Gollancz, 1971)
- The Life and Times of Frédérick Lemaître: Actor, Lover and Idol of Paris (Hamish Hamilton, 1959)
- Against Nature (Penguin Classics) by Joris-Karl Huysmans (translator; Penguin, 1959)
- The Goncourts (Bowes and Bowes, 1960)
- Napoleon's Son by André Castelot (translator; Hamish Hamilton, 1960)
- The First Bohemian: The Life of Henry Murger (Hamish Hamilton, 1961)
- The Memoirs of Chateaubriand (editor & translator; Hamish Hamilton, 1961)
- Three Tales (Penguin Classics) by Gustave Flaubert (translator; Penguin, 1961)
- Pages from the Goncourt Journals (editor & translator; Oxford University Press, 1962; The Folio Society, 1980; NYRB, 2006)
- Centuries of Childhood by Philippe Aries (translator; Jonathan Cape, 1962)
- Cruel Tales (Oxford Library of French Classics) by Auguste Villiers de l'Isle-Adam (translator; Oxford University Press, 1963)
- The Battle of Dienbienphu by Jules Roy (translator; Harper & Row, 1965)
- The Siege of Paris (Batsford, 1964)
- Sentimental Education (Penguin Classics) by Gustave Flaubert (translator; Penguin, 1964)
- The Duel: A History of Duelling (Chapman and Hall, 1965)
- Nausea (Penguin Modern Classics) by Jean-Paul Sartre (translator; Penguin, 1965)
- Hell by Henri Barbusse (translator; Chapman & Hall, 1966)
- The Trial of Marshal Pétain by Jules Roy (translator; Faber, 1968)
- Around the Moon by Jules Verne (translator; J. M. Dent & Sons, 1970)
- Dreamers of Decadence: Symbolist Painters of the 1890s by Philippe Jullian (translator; Pall Mall Press, 1971)
- Aphrodite by Pierre Louÿs (translator; Panther, 1972)

== See also ==
- Translated Penguin Book - at Penguin First Editions reference site of early first edition Penguin Books.
