= Carl Schmitz-Pleis =

German painter

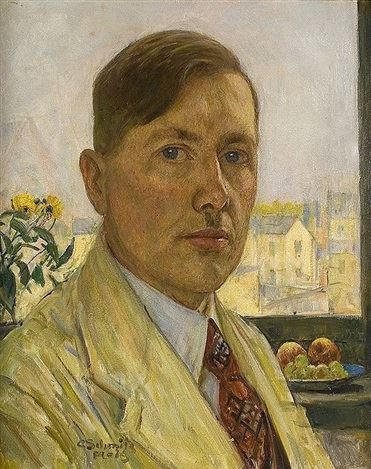
Self-portrait (date unknown)

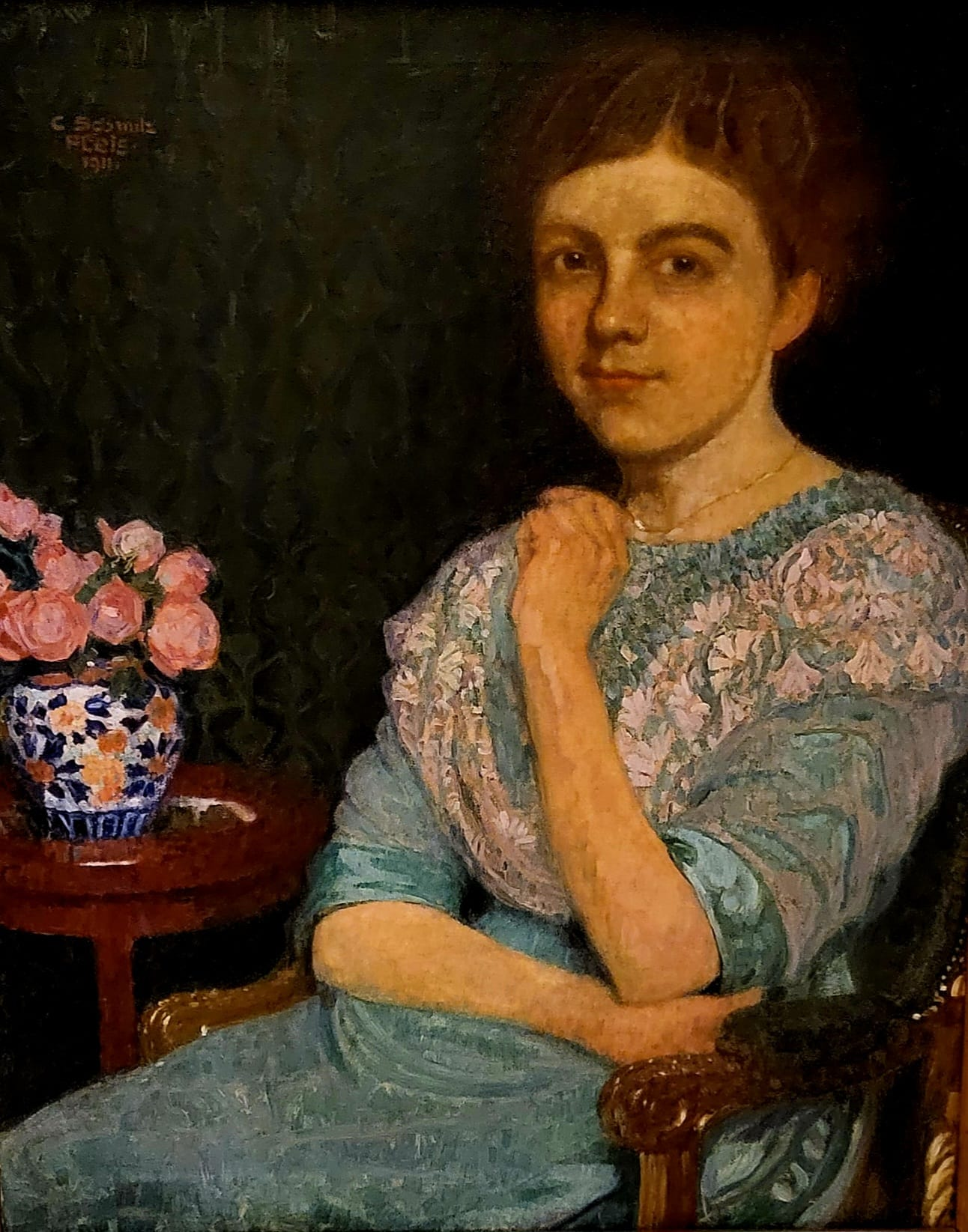
Lady in Aquamarine, 1911

Carl Schmitz-Pleis, originally Karl Schmitz (21 September 1877 – 1943) was a German painter.

== Life and work ==
He was born in Hennef. He studied at the Kunstakademie Düsseldorf with Johann Peter Theodor Janssen, Eduard von Gebhardt and Claus Meyer. At first, he signed his works with his birth name, but later adopted "Carl Schmitz-Pleis" as a more distinctive artistic pseudonym. The "Pleis" was taken from Oberpleis, near Königswinter, where his older brother Heinrich lived with his family. Carl was a frequent visitor there.

In 1907 and 1908, together with Josef Kohlschein, Hubert Ritzenhofen, Walter Ophey and Carl Plückebaum, among others, he helped to create "Niederrhein" (Lower Rhine), a progressive artists' association. In the Spring of 1910, he and several other members of the group travelled to Italy, with the goal of "capturing nature in the sunlight". From 1913 to 1928, he was a member of Malkasten, another progressive association.

He took part in numerous large art exhibitions, at the Alte Kunsthalle and the Kunstpalast, as well as organizing the annual exhibitions held by Niederrhein. In his later years, he rarely left Düsseldorf; dying unmarried, childless, and apparently forgotten, in 1943.

Generally, he is associated with the Düsseldorfer Malerschule. His works cover a wide range of genres, including landscapes, still-lifes, and portraits. The influence of Paul Cézanne is readily noticeable. In retrospect, he can be considered the most important German representative of Neo-Impressionism and Post-Impressionism alongside Paul Baum. His works can be seen at the Museum Kunstpalast and the Stiftung Sammlung Volmer in Wuppertal.
