= Hippolyte Petitjean =

French painter (1854–1929)

- Born: 11 September 1854; Mâcon
- Died: 18 September 1929 (aged 75); Paris
- Known for: Painting
- Movement: Post-Impressionism

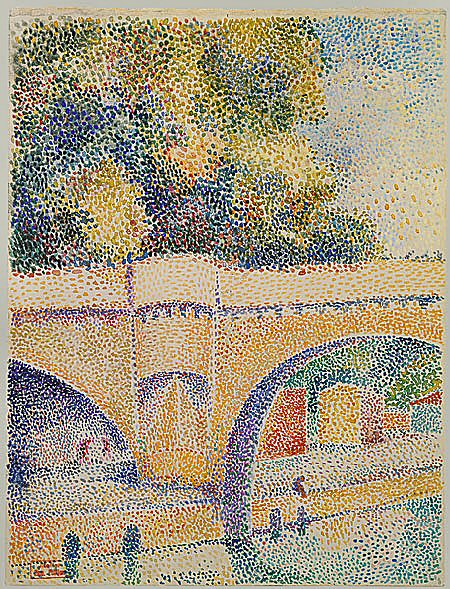
Le Pont Neuf (c. 1912)

Hippolyte Petitjean (French pronunciation: [ipɔlit pətiʒɑ̃]; 11 September 1854, Mâcon – 18 September 1929, Paris) was a French Post-Impressionist painter who practiced the technique of pointillism.

== Biography ==
When he was 13, Petitjean began his art studies at the Ecole de dessin in Mâcon. The town gave him a grant to continue at the École des Beaux-Arts where he studied under Alexandre Cabanel and Pierre Puvis de Chavannes. He was later influenced by Georges Seurat whom he met in Paris in 1884. After Seurat encouraged him to join the Neo-Impressionists, he was also influenced by Paul Signac and Camille Pissarro. He adopted the pointillist technique until 1894 when he started to combine it with more feathery strokes. In 1910, he returned to Neo-Impressionism with a series of decorative watercolours of landscapes and people set off by widely spaced rounded spots of pure colour.

Petitjean exhibited at the Salon des Indépendants in 1891 and thereafter at Le Brac de Bouteville together with the symbolists and impressionists. He also exhibited in Brussels in 1893 and 1898, Berlin in 1898, Weimar in 1903, and Wiesbaden in 1921.

== Selected works ==
- Jeune femme assise (1892), oil on canvas, 73 x 60.5 cm, Musée des Beaux-Arts, Nancy.
- Le Pont Neuf (c. 1914), watercolour and gouache on paper, 250 x 190 cm, Metropolitan Museum of Art, New-York.
- Barque sur un étang (c.1912–1929), watercolour on paper, 30 x 48 cm, Musée Thyssen-Bornemisza, Madrid.
- La Danse du printemps (1911), oil on canvas, 54 x 105 cm, Musée des Ursulines, Mâcon.
- Baigneuse (1921), oil on canvas, 55 x 38 cm, Musée d'Orsay, Paris.
