= Louis Hayet =

French painter (1864–1940)

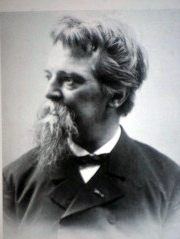
Louis Hayet (date unknown)

Louis Hayet (29 August 1864, Pontoise – 27 December 1940, Cormeilles-en-Parisis) was a French Post-Impressionist painter.

== Biography ==
His parents, Calixte and Léontine Hayet, were very poor. As a child, he was very shy, but displayed a talent for painting as early as 1876. From 1877 to 1884, he worked with his father, who had become a travelling salesman. He was able to study, briefly, at the École des Arts Décoratifs, but seems to have been largely self-taught; although he certainly benefitted from a friendship with Camille Pissarro and his son, Lucien, whom he had met while painting in the countryside.

He was initially associated with the Neo-impressionists, such as Paul Signac and Georges Seurat. For a time, he practiced Pointillism, but returned to more classical styles in 1890. As a result, Paul Signac removed his name from the second edition of his book, From Eugène Delacroix to Neo-impressionism (considered to be the manifesto of Pointillism).

His original workshop was in La Frette, where he painted numerous cityscapes and landscapes. He also visited Brittany and painted maritime scenes. When he moved to Paris in 1885, he set up a studio in Montmartre on the Rue d'Orchampt. He was especially fond of depicting the circus and other entertainments. However, most of his living was earned as a decorative painter. His first exhibit did not come until 1889.

In 1894, while exhibiting at Le Barc de Boutteville, he met the actor, Lugné-Poe, who asked him to create theatrical sets for his Théâtre de l'Œuvre; a project that he was engaged in for thirty years. Hayet's cousin, the Director of the École d'Alembert in Montévrain, hired him as a Professor of ornamental design; a post he held until 1911. In 1910, he won the Concours Lépine for devising a tripod with a triptych table.

Several private exhibitions in the 1900s were unsuccessful and he continued to earn his living doing commercial work. After that time, he focused on painting scenes of Paris. After World War I, he concentrated on still-lifes. By the mid 1920s, he was forgotten. He would spend the last part of his career conducting scientific research on colors and pigments but, by the 1930s, he had given up painting and was in poor health. Of his estimated 500 paintings, over half are lost or unaccounted for.

A small college in Cormeilles-en-Parisis has been named after him.

== Selected paintings ==
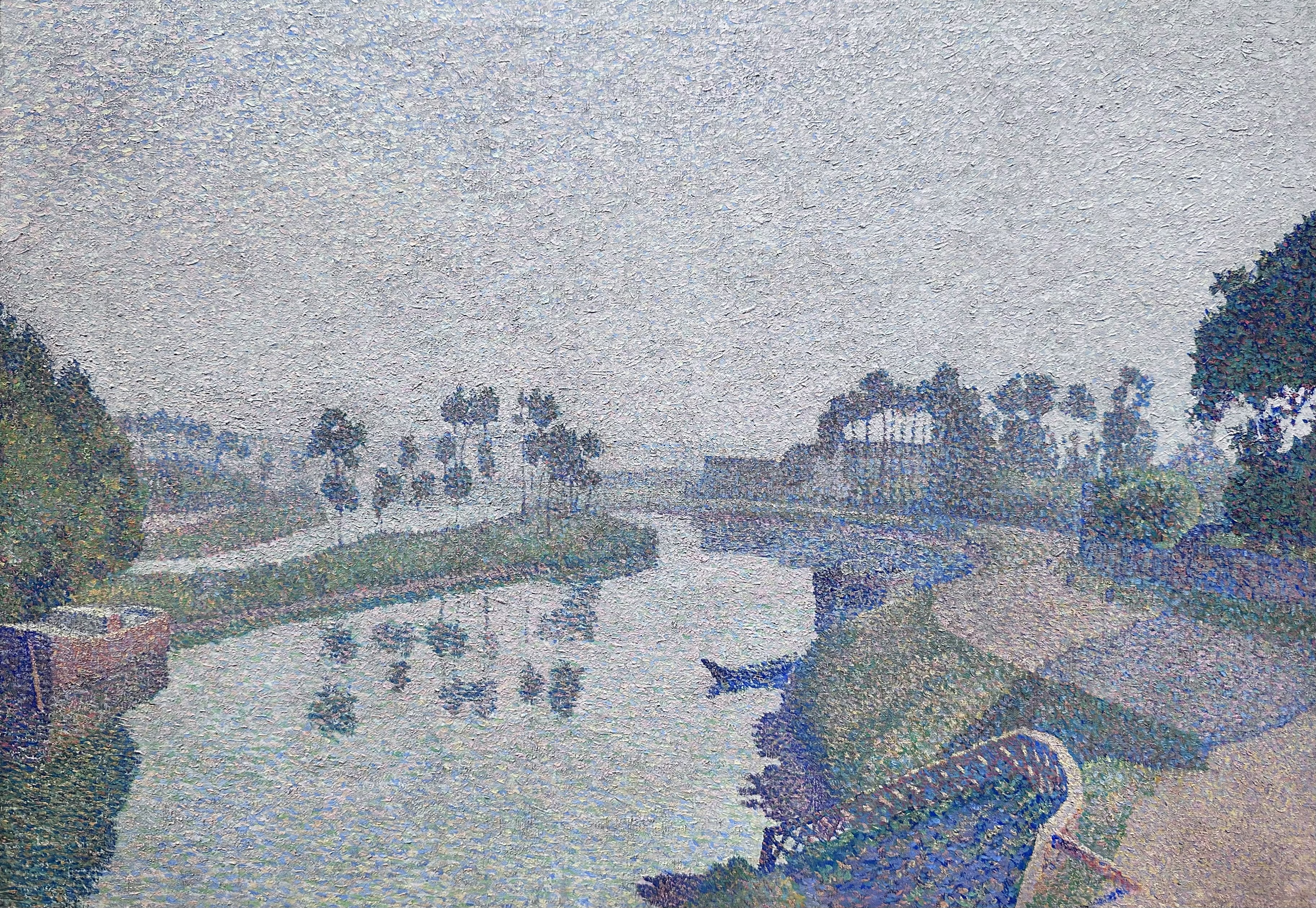
Banks of the Oise at Dawn (1888)

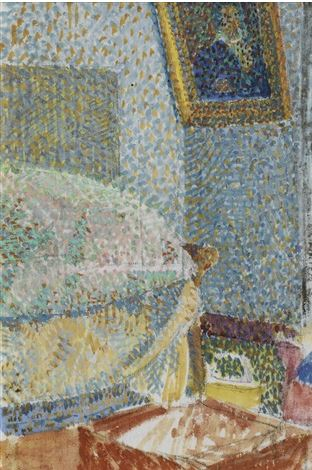
The Room (1888)

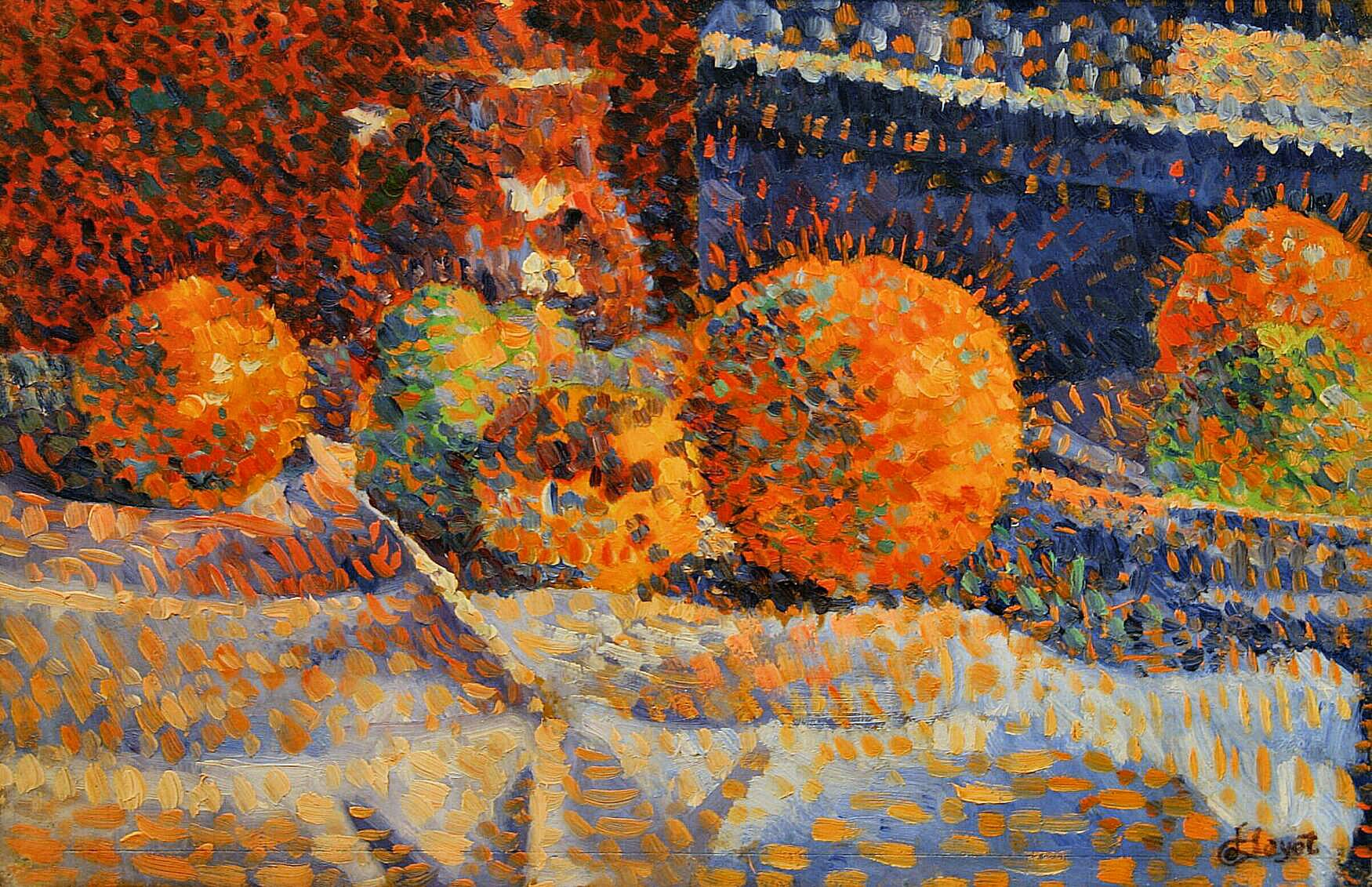
Still-life with Oranges (1888-89)

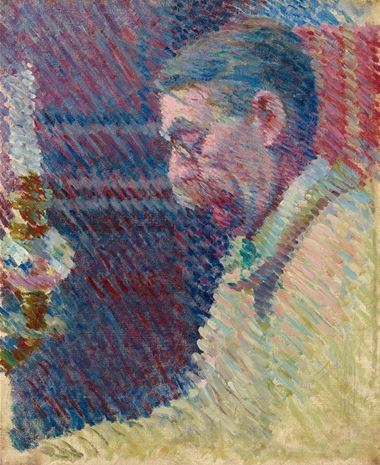
Portrait of Émile Verhaeren (1896)

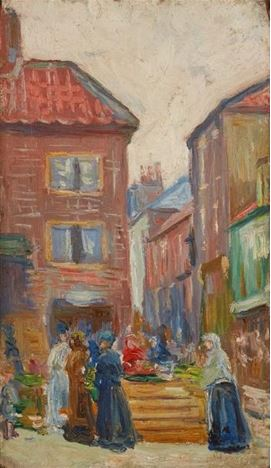
Market Day in Pontoise (1913)

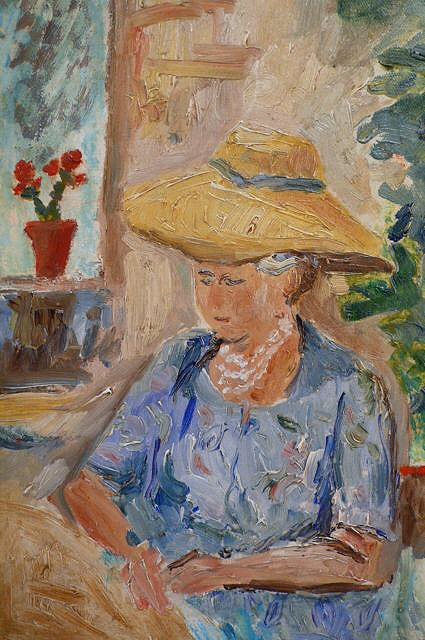
Woman in a Hat
