= Paul Baum (artist) =

German painter (1859–1932)

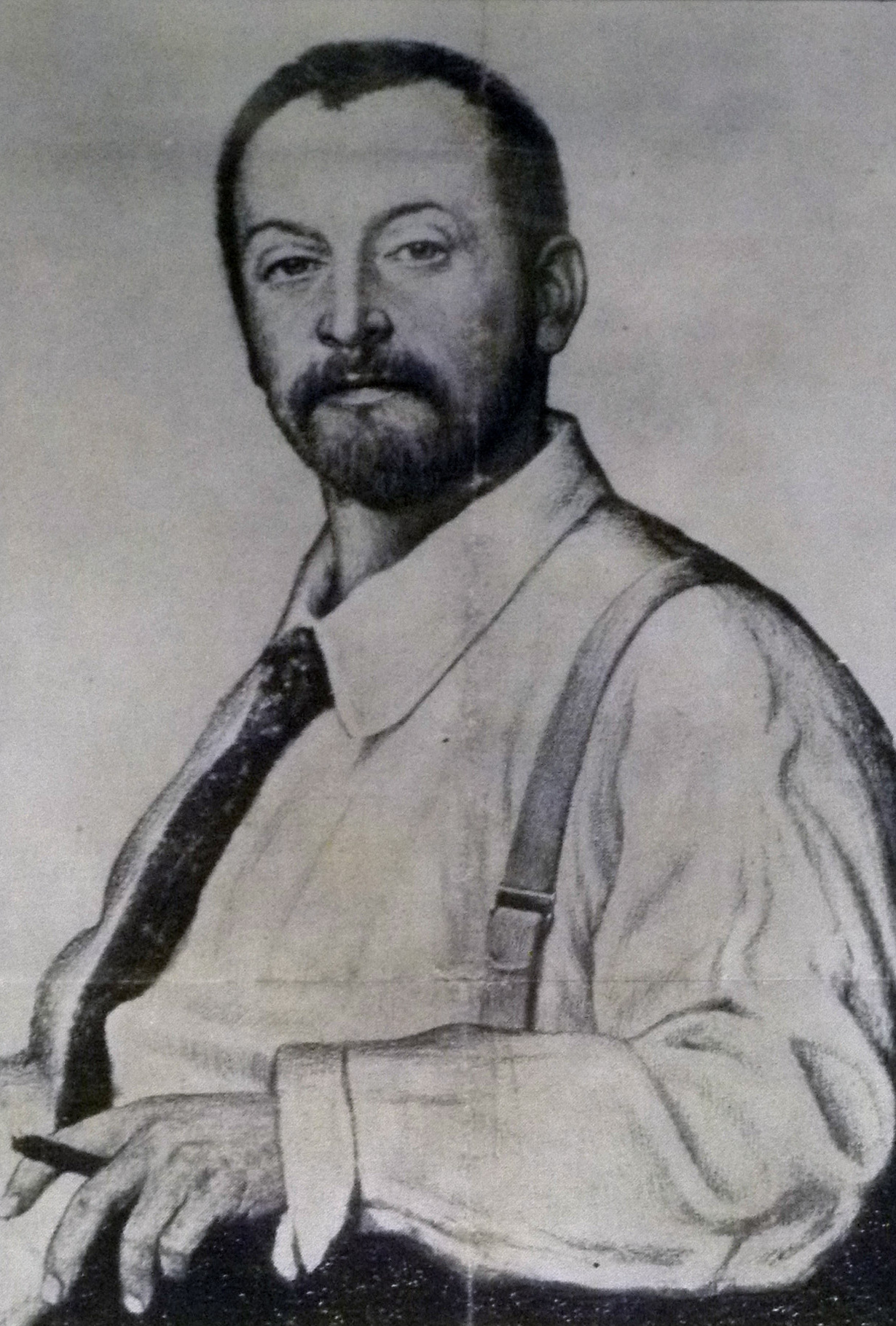
- Baum in an illustration for a German newspaper (1899)
- Born: 22 September 1859; Meissen, Kingdom of Saxony
- Died: 15 May 1932 (aged 72); San Gimignano, Italy
- Education: Grand-Ducal Saxon Art School
- Style: Neo-Impressionism

Paul Baum (22 September 1859 – 15 May 1932) was a German painter, draftsman and printmaker. He was the most important representative of Neo-Impressionism in Germany.

== Life ==
He began as a flower painter at the Royal Porcelain Factory. In 1877, he decided to study with Friedrich Preller at the Dresden Academy of Fine Arts. A year later, he switched to the Weimar Saxon-Grand Ducal Art School, where he studied under Theodor Hagen until 1887. During his studies, he travelled to Mecklenburg and Hamburg as well as Holland and Flanders. In 1888, he stayed briefly at the art colony in Dachau District.

During a trip to Paris in 1890, he had his first encounter with French Impressionism. Afterwards, he left Dachau and spent four years in Knokke, Belgium, where he became friends with Camille Pissarro and the Belgian pointillist painter Théo van Rysselberghe. In 1894, he returned to Dresden and became part of the Dresden Secession. However, he continued to be restless and, in 1895, moved to Sint Anna ter Muiden near Sluis, where he lived until 1908. Even so, his stay there was interrupted by numerous trips to Berlin, the south of France, Italy and Turkey.

While visiting Berlin in 1902, he became a member of the Berlin Secession. In 1909, he joined the Neue Künstlervereinigung München (N.K.V.M.) and participated in their first exhibition. That same year, he received the Villa Romana Prize, which included a one-year stay in Rome. He then travelled to Tuscany, remaining there for four years in San Gimignano and, then, Florence. After the outbreak of war in 1914, he returned to Germany and became a professor at the Academy. But, after a year, he was again on the move.

He stayed briefly at the Willingshäuser Art Colony and went from there to Neustadt near Marburg. When his friend, Carl Bantzer, was appointed professor at the Kunsthochschule Kassel in 1918, Baum took his place as a teacher of landscape painting. In 1921, he bought a house in Marburg, intending it to be his permanent residence but, from 1924 on, lived mostly in San Gimignano. He died of pneumonia there in 1932.

== Selected paintings ==
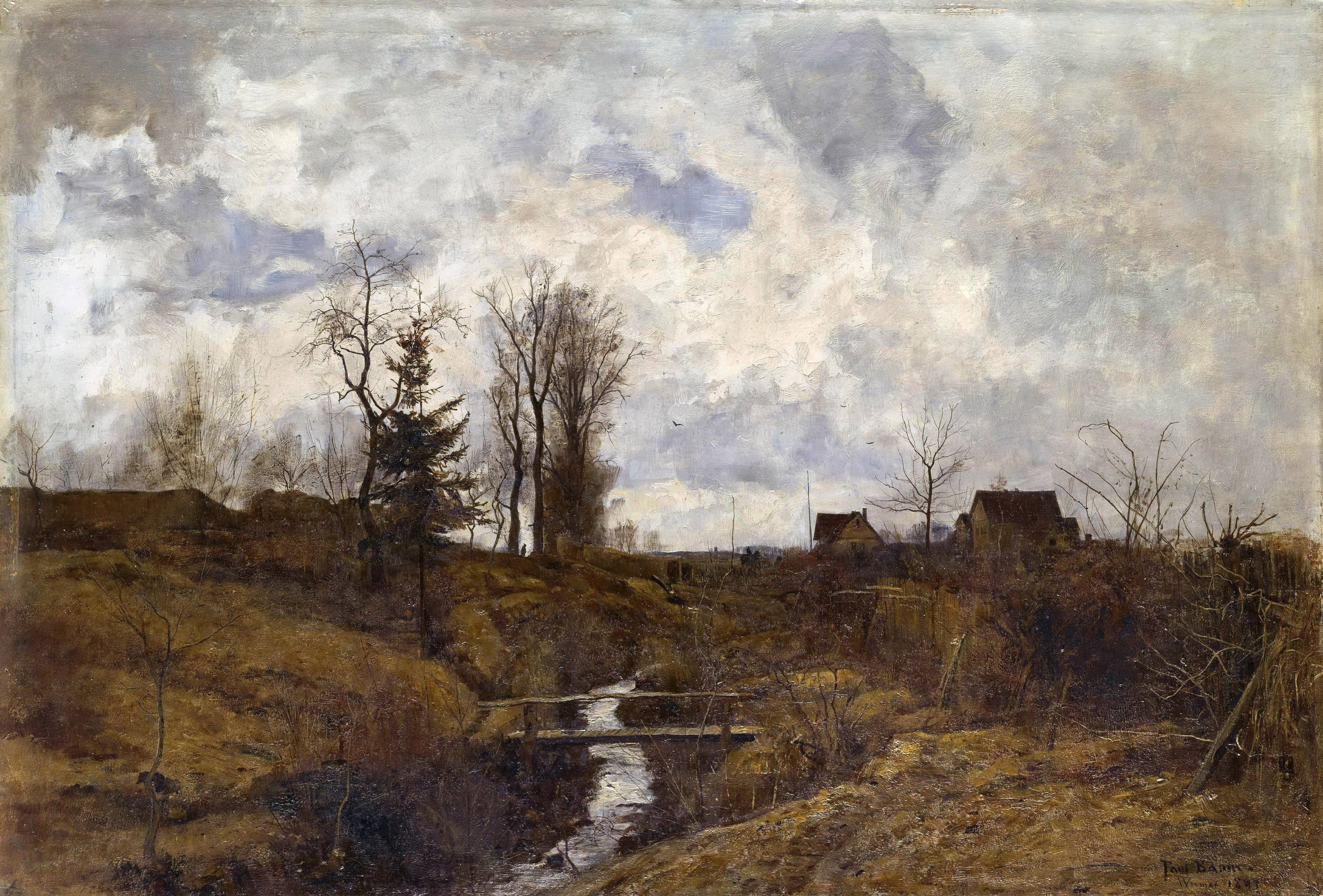
Weimar in the Rain (1883)

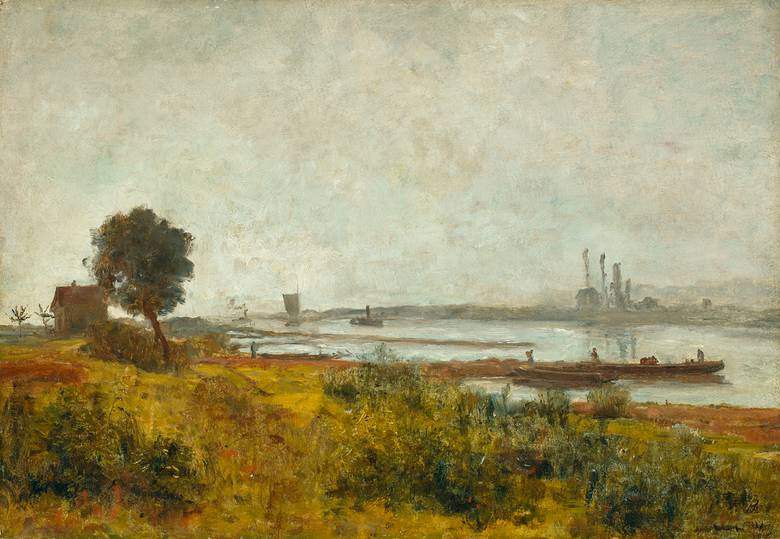
River Landscape in Mecklenburg (1895)

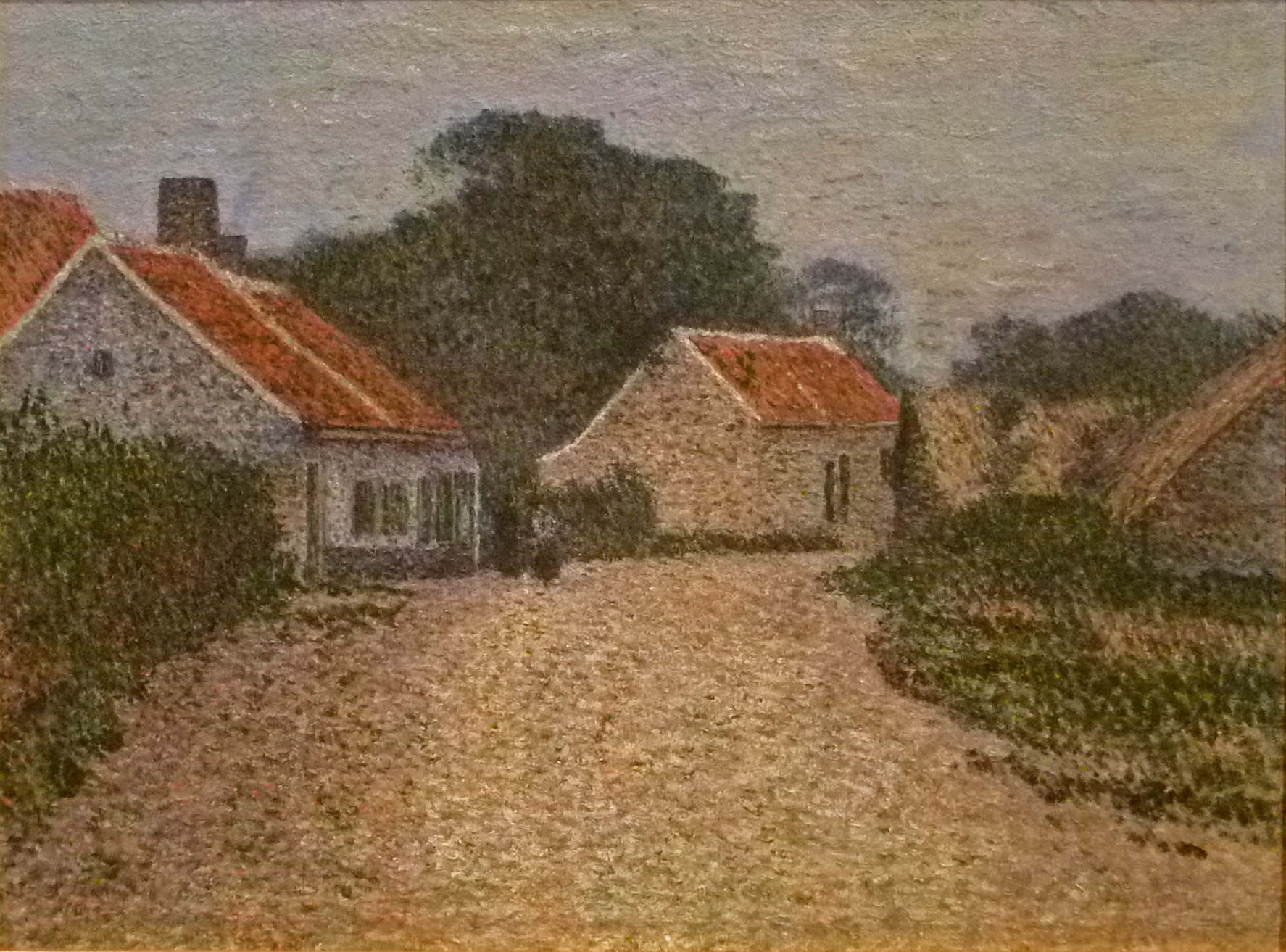
Sint Anna ter Muiden (c.1902)

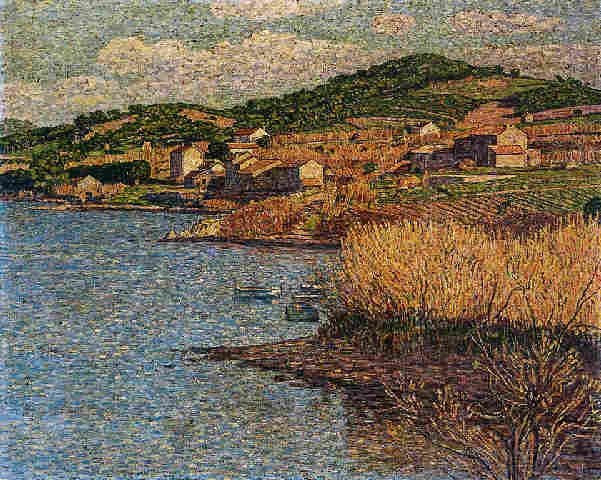
Landscape near Hyères (1909)
