= Parade de cirque =

Painting by Georges Seurat

- Circus Sideshow (English)
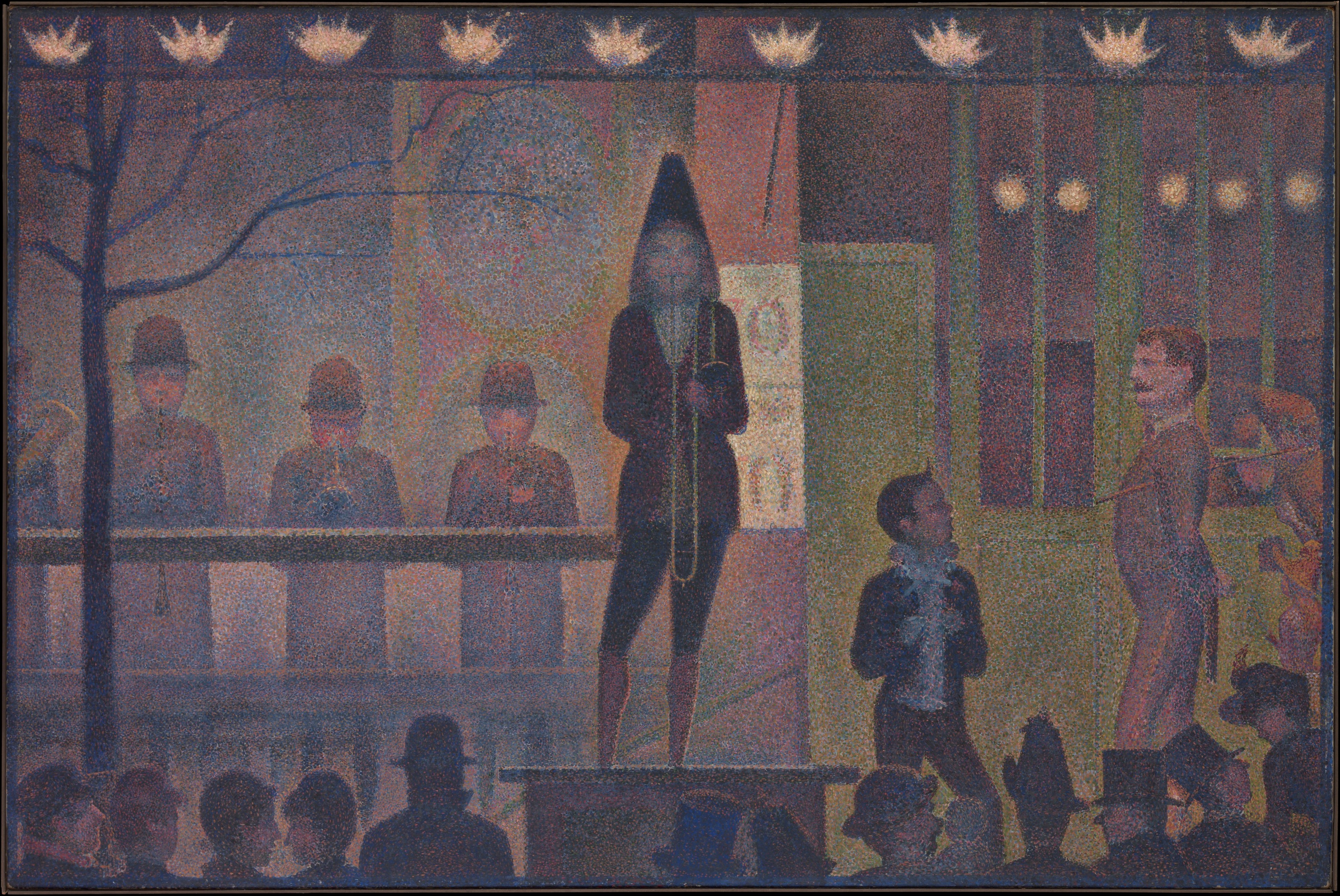
- Artist: Georges Seurat
- Year: 1887–88
- Medium: Oil on canvas
- Dimensions: 99.7 cm × 140.9 cm (39.25 in × 59 in)
- Location: Metropolitan Museum of Art, New York
- Website: Museum page

Parade de cirque (English: Circus Sideshow) is an 1887–88 Neo-Impressionist painting by Georges Seurat. It was first exhibited at the 1888 Salon de la Société des Artistes Indépendants (titled Parade de cirque, cat. no. 614) in Paris, where it became one of Seurat's least admired works. Parade de cirque represents the sideshow (or parade) of the Circus Corvi at place de la Nation, and was his first depiction of a nocturnal scene, and first painting of popular entertainment. Seurat worked on the theme for nearly six years before completing the final painting.

Art historian Alfred H. Barr Jr. described Parade de cirque as one of Seurat's most important paintings, its 'formality' and 'symmetry' as highly innovative, and placed it as "the most geometric in design as well as the most mysterious in sentiment" of Seurat's major canvases.

Circus Sideshow influenced the Fauves, Cubists, Futurists and Orphists. It is located at the Metropolitan Museum of Art in New York (Bequest of Stephen C. Clark, 1960, accession number: 61.101.17, Gallery 826).

== Description ==
Circus Sideshow is a large oil painting on canvas measuring 99.7 × 149.9 centimetres (39.3 × 59.0 in). Painted in the Divisionist style, the work employs pointillist dots of color (primarily violet-gray, blue-gray, orange, and green) and a play of lines governed by rules whose laws Seurat had studied. It depicts immobile figures outdoors under artificial lighting at the sideshow of the Circus Corvi at place de la Nation, a working-class quarter in eastern Paris. A row of cornet and trombone players in solemn formation are seen under the unreal evening lights of a parade. The work is dominated by a monotony of horizontal and vertical lines, suggesting the rhythms of Egyptian reliefs and frescoes. Though rather than indicating distance as Egyptian art (by changing scale), or classically (by foreshortening), Seurat establishes the position of his subjects through lighting. Those in the foreground are unlit, painted in dark blue, while those behind the gas jets are brilliantly lit.

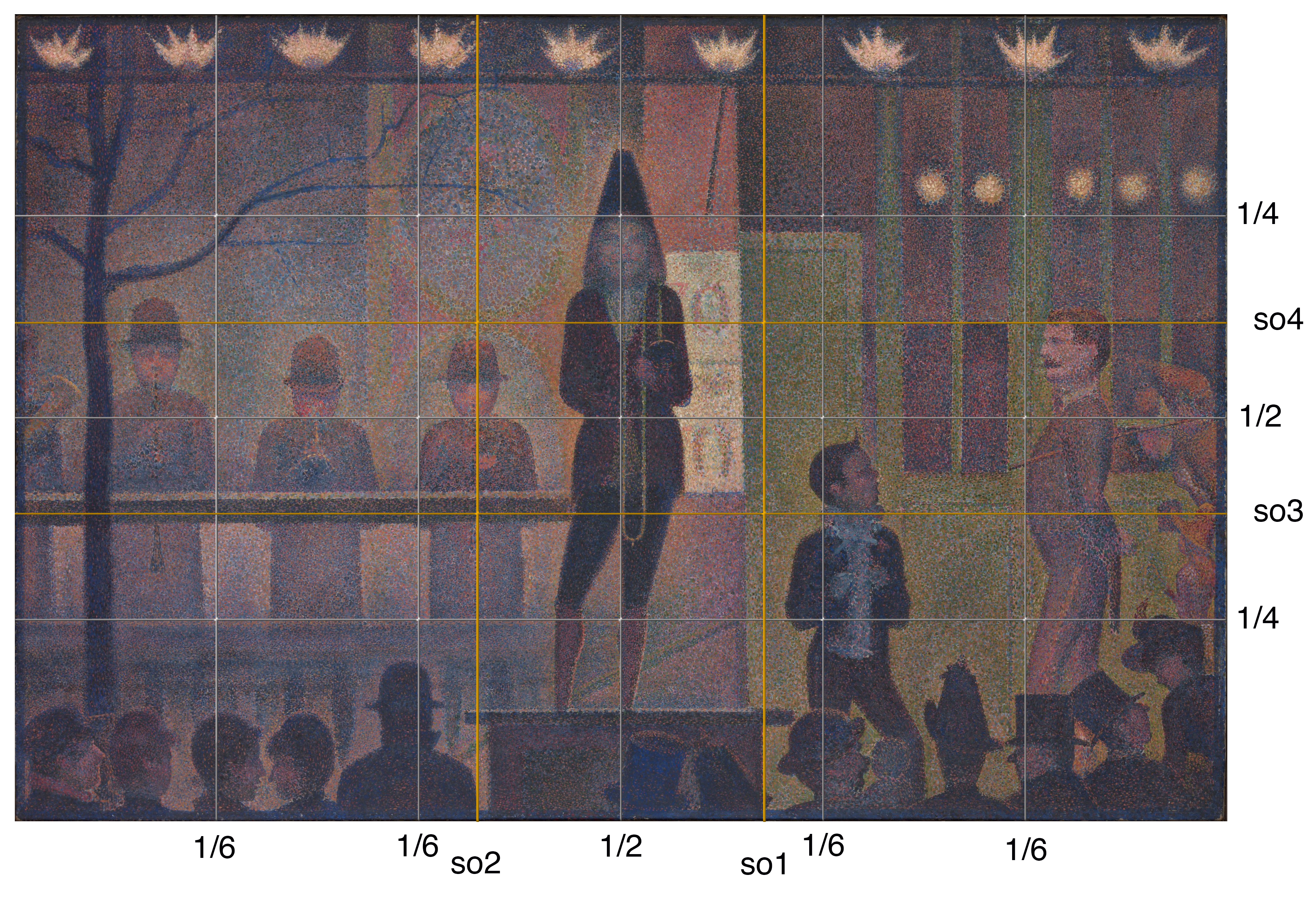
Parade de cirque with golden mean overlay, showing a close approximation to the divine proportion

Seurat's view of this scene is so radically flattened that it is difficult to identify the composition's multiple levels. The golden section appears to govern its geometric structure, though modern consensus among art historians is that Seurat never used this divine proportion in his work.

The final study of Parade, executed prior to the oil on canvas, is divided horizontally into fourths and vertically into sixths. The 4 : 6 ratio corresponds to the dimensions of the canvas, which is one and one-half times wider than its vertical dimension. An additional vertical axes was drawn by Seurat, which neither corresponds to the location of the figures, nor to the architectural construction of the work; neither do these axes correspond precisely to the golden section, 1 : 1.6, as might have been expected. Rather, they correspond to basic mathematical divisions (simple ratios that appear to approximate the golden section), as noted by Seurat with citations from Charles Henry.

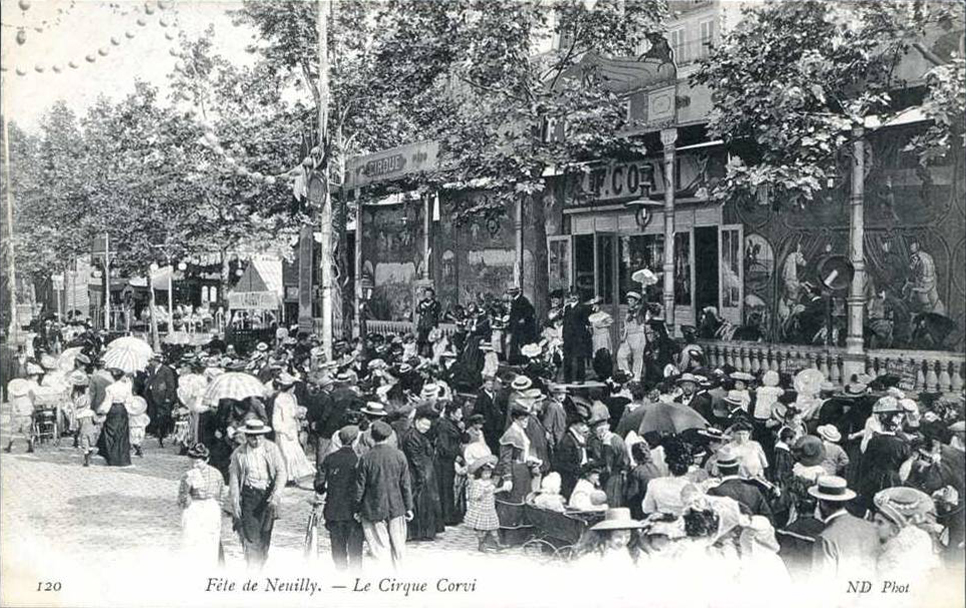
Fête de Neuilly, Le Cirque Corvi, c.1900

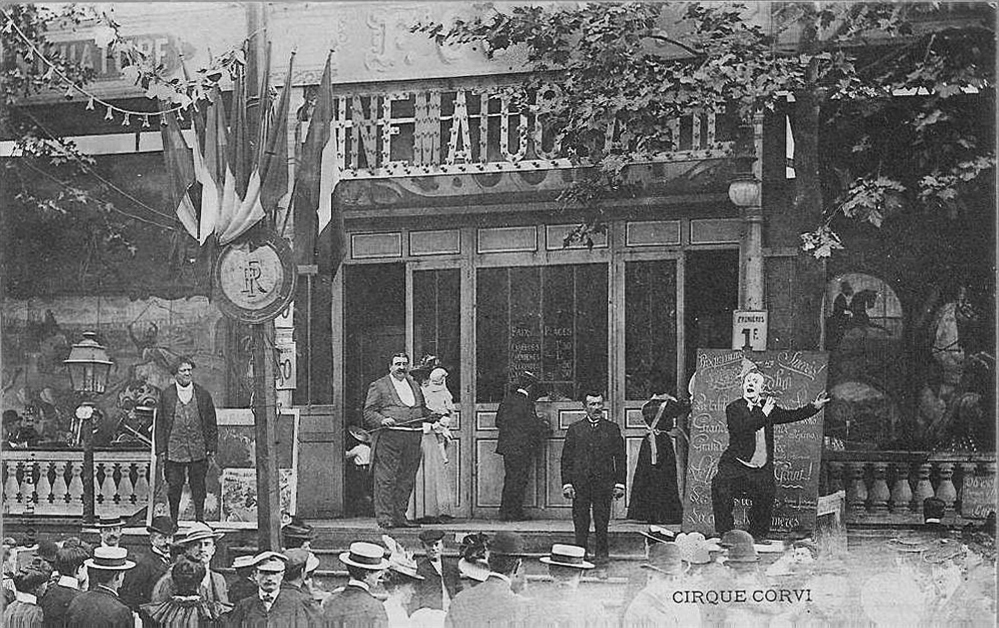
Fête de Neuilly-sur-Seine, Le Cirque Corvi, postcard c. 1900

The entrance of the circus tent consists of ticket window and doors at the center of a platform atop six steps. On both sides of the doors (here painted green), musicians and acrobats perform a sideshow on the balustraded platform to entice passersby. Those interested in purchasing tickets from the ticket seller—the man and woman toward the bottom right of the painting—climb the central stairs. Ticket holders queue parallel to the sideshow stage. The diagonal line behind the trombonist is the handrail for the subsidiary stairs. A woman with a young girl is buying a ticket on the platform to the right of the ringmaster. Just as the musicians toward the left, they are immersed in the orange glow of nine gas jets (each possessing a perceptible blue-violet aura) that illuminate the platform. Five yellow-white globes of interior lamps are visible through the ticket windows. The conspicuous tree to the left bares the presence of a human figure.

A boy with a ruffled collar stands performing in front of the platform at the top of the central stairs. Despite appearances, the door behind him is on a different plane from the ticket window. The rectangular structure behind the trombonist (to the right), defines the edge of the platform and shows the admission price. Above the poster is the gas pipe support beam. The trombonist stands shadowed on a pedestal (left of the central stairs) several meters in front of the platform, illuminated from the rear. While the tuba player is faceless, the red faces of the clarinetist and cornet players show that they stand on the gaslit platform.

A 1990 examination of Circus Sideshow at the Metropolitan Museum of Art laboratory under light similar in color to that given off by gas lamps, revealed an "extraordinary transformation", writes art historian Robert Herbert: "Under the colored light the faces of the figures on the platform no longer appeared unnaturally orange but flesh color, the shadows on the trombonist and on the spectators were no longer bright ultramarine blue but black, and the entire painting glowed as if it were lit from behind, which, of course, is precisely the effect of contre-lumiere on which Seurat predicated the picture."

== Background and reception ==
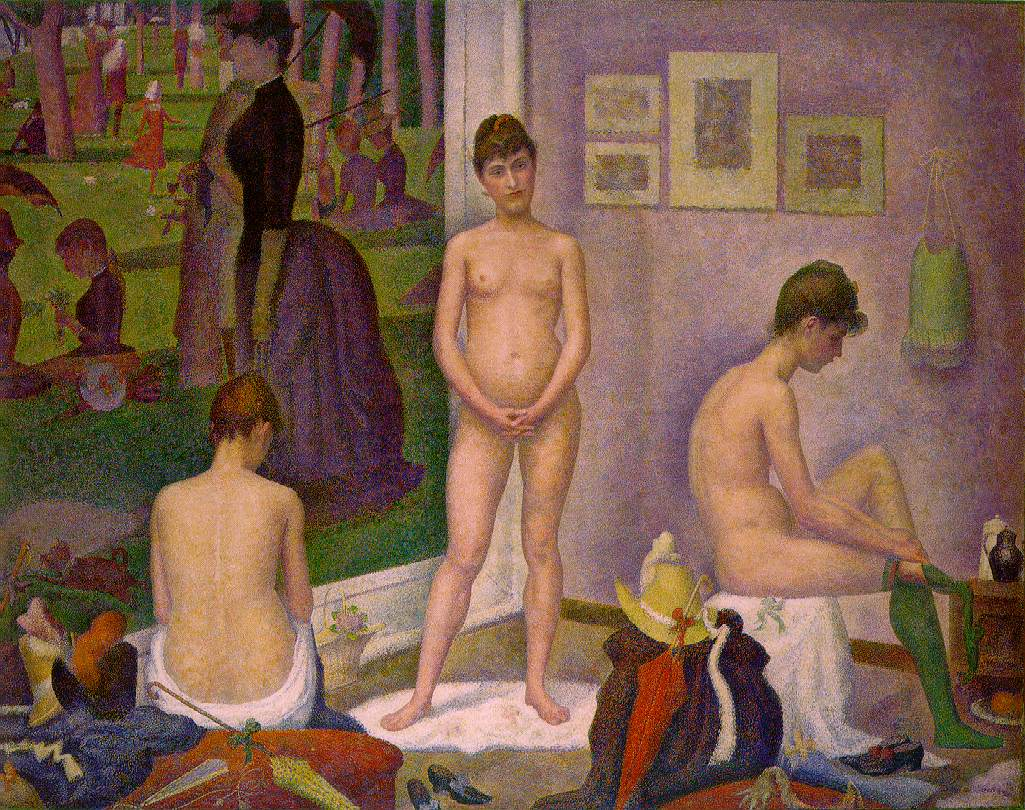
Georges Seurat, 1884–1886, Models (Les Poseuses), oil on canvas, 207.6 × 308 cm, Barnes Foundation, Philadelphia

Itinerant fairs housed in temporary structures such as the Circus Corvi made seasonal appearances along the boulevards of Paris. Seurat's interest in these fairs produced several studies in anticipation of Parade de cirque, including a series of cafe-concert performances, performing saltimbanques or acrobats. The name Fernand Corvi appears on Seurat's small sketch for the ticket window.

Gustave Kahn characterized Parade de cirque as "so willfully pallid and sad". The painting was overshadowed by the much larger Models (Les Poseuses) when first exhibited at the 1888 Salon des Indépendants. Subsequently neglected by Seurat himself, Parade was not included among the large canvases listed in his "ésthetique" of 1890.

Robert Herbert writes of Parade:

Falling uneasily between the huge, early plein-air paintings Baignade and La Grande Jatte and the late indoor scenes Chahut and Cirque, Parade has neither the grandeur of the former nor the posterlike memorability of the latter. Yet it nonetheless demands a central role in Seurat's concise oeuvre. Not only is it his first painting of a nocturnal scene and therefore an important stage in the development of the artist's new "chrono-luminarist" style, it is also his first painting to depict the performance of a popular entertainment, a genre—already developed in drawings—that would dominate the artist's large projects for the remainder of his brief career. Apart from issues of chronological priority, however, Parade also distinguishes itself as Seurat's most mysterious painting, a brooding masterpiece that reveals its meaning reluctantly, a disarmingly simple geometrical schema that conceals a complex spatial arrangement... The evocative depiction of ethereal, penumbral light is unquestionably the key feature of Seurat's Parade.

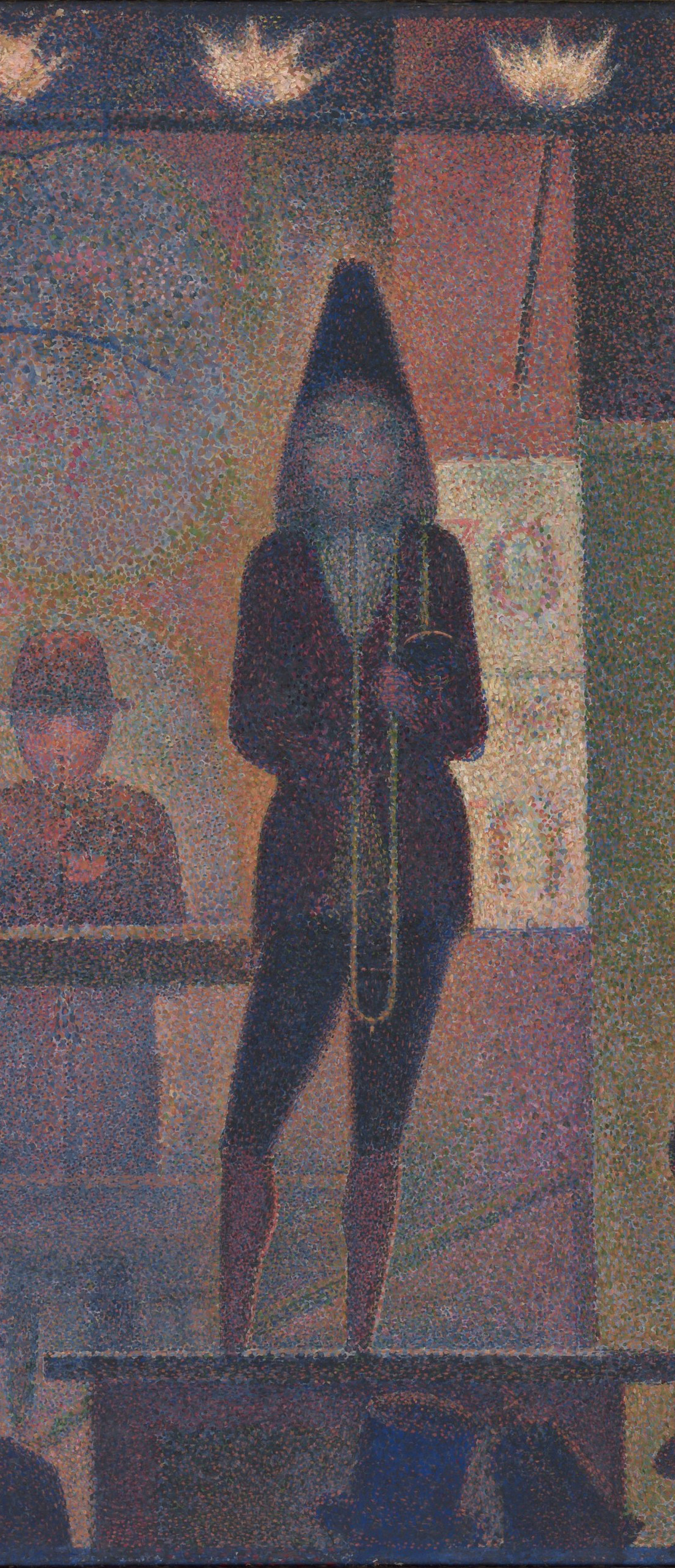
Parade de cirque, detail of the central figure

With respect to the peculiar mood and appearance of Parade, art historian John Russell has proposed a literary inspiration, as opposed to a political or scientific basis; citing Arthur Rimbaud's poem a La parade, published in the Symbolist review La vogue, 13 May 1886. It had long been believed that Charles Henry's theories on the emotional and symbolic expression of lines, shapes and colors were at the root of Parade. Though, it wasn't until the 1890 exhibition of Le Chahut (two year after the completion of Parade) that critics remarked on a connection between the work of Seurat and the theories of Henry.

"No amount of geometry", write's Russell, "can hide the fact that this picture offers a criticism of society. But the criticism is a poet's not a politician's." If this were the case, Herbert points out, "it is unclear what the artist's message was." The subjects appear to be ordinary middle and working class spectator's and performers, without caricature of the type produced by Henri de Toulouse-Lautrec or 19th century satirists such as Paul Gavarni or Honoré Daumier.

Mirroring Seurat's work, Rimbaud writes of the circus sideshow as a reflection of contemporary life: "their bantering or their terror lasts one minute, or whole months." Robert Herbert suggested an alternative poem that more closely parallels the mood of Parade, Jules Laforgue's Soir de carnaval: "Oh, life is too sad, incurably sad / At festivals here and there I have always sobbed: / 'Vanity, vanity, all is only vanity!' /—Then I think: where are the ashes of the psalmist?" Seurat almost certainly knew both poems, writes Herbert, "and either—or both—could have inspired him."

Art historian Roger Fry, commenting on the unforeseen mystery of Parade, compared it to the paintings of Lautrec:

Toulouse-Lautrec would have seized at once on all that was significant of the moral atmosphere, would have seized most of all on what satisfied his slightly morbid relish of depravity... But Seurat, one feels, saw it almost as one might suppose some visitant from another planet would have done. He saw it with this penetrating exactness of a gaze vacant of all direct understanding... Each figure seems to be so perfectly enclosed within its simplified contour, for, however precise and detailed Seurat is, his passion for geometricizing never deserts him—enclosed so completely, so shut off in its partition, that no other relation than a spatial and geometrical one is any longer possible. The syntax of actual life has been broken up and replaced by Seurat's own peculiar syntax with all its strange, remote and unforeseen implications.

André Salmon included this painting among other works by Seurat that were misunderstood by his contemporaries and which demonstrated "profound intention".

== Criticism ==
Though Parade de cirque was eclipsed by Les Poseuses at the 1888 Salon des Indépendants, several critics did mention the arduous and innovative lighting effects employed by Seurat. Félix Fénéon pointed out that it was only "interesting insofar as it applies to a nocturne a method pointillism, that has been mainly used for daylight effects."

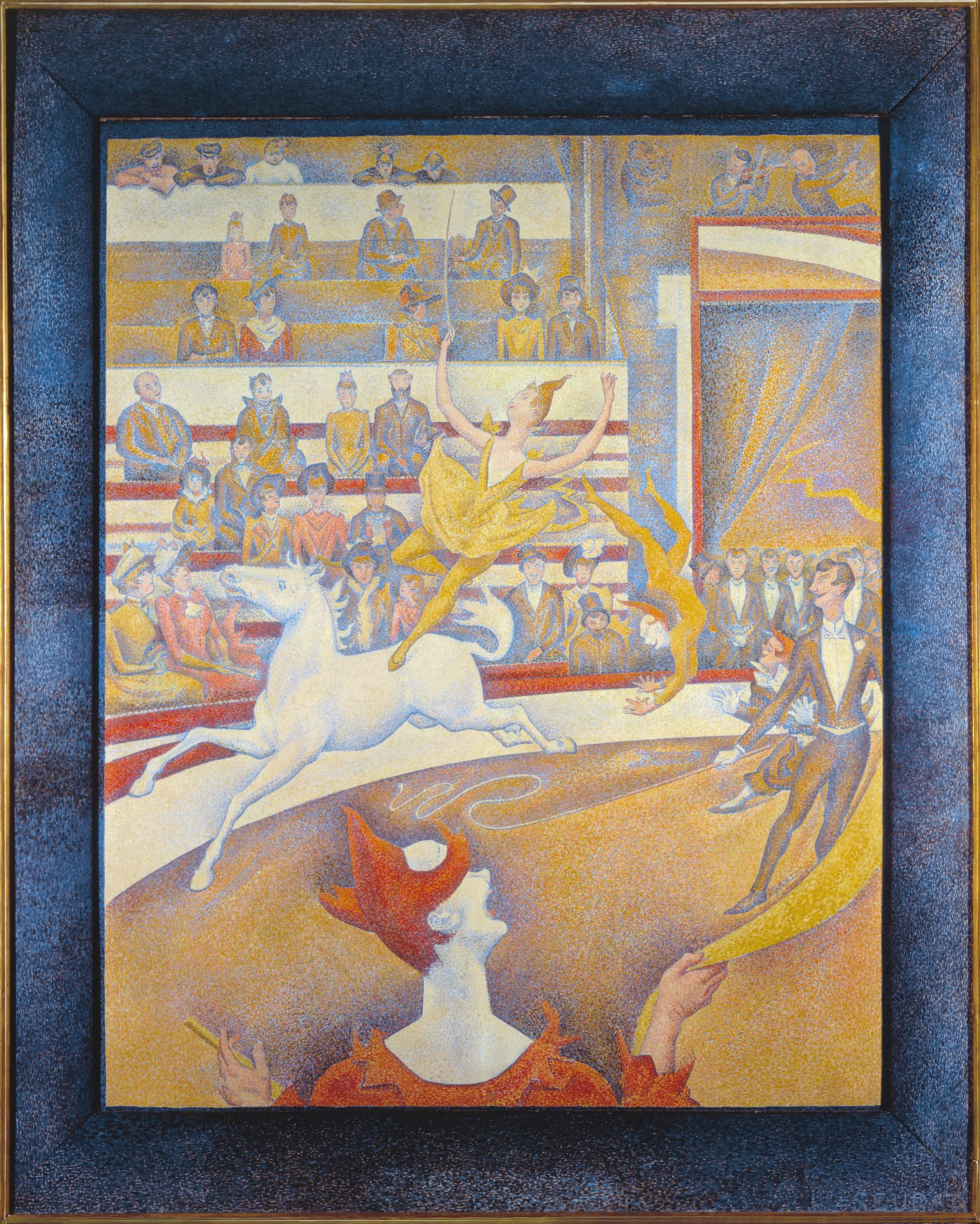
Georges Seurat, 1891, Le Cirque (The Circus), oil on canvas, 185 x 152 cm, Musée d'Orsay, Paris

Jules Christophe referred to Parade as a "curious essay in nocturnal effects." Gustave Geffroy, following his commentary on Seurat's other entries at the Indépendants, wrote, "Parade de cirque, on the contrary, has little allure, a poverty of silhouette, a pallid appearance with awkward contrasts."

Gustave Kahn sympathetically stated, "In this research, new to him, into the effects of gas [lighting], M. Seurat perhaps may not arrive at the harmonious and seductive impression of Poseuses, but the effort was difficult and the qualities of the painter rest there." Kahn's commentary on the work was similar following its 1892 exhibition in Brussels: "Parade de cirque is conceived in a note of hazy fairground light. The sideshow performers are blurred in a kind of mist through which the gaslights attempt to burn. A clown, in the middle of the picture, is silhouetted against a noisy stand. This painting is not as decisive as Cirque... which is incidentally the most beautiful painting in the exhibition."

More recently, Meyer Schapiro wrote of Parade's "marvelous delicacy of tone, the uncountable variations within a narrow range, the vibrancy and soft luster, which make his canvases ... a joy to contemplate."

== Influence ==
By 1904 Neo-Impressionism had evolved considerably, in a move away from nature, away from imitation, toward the distillation of essential geometric shapes and harmonious movements. These forms were considered superior to nature because they contained idea, representing the dominance of the artist over nature. Henri-Edmond Cross, Paul Signac, along with Henri Matisse, Jean Metzinger, Robert Delaunay, André Derain (of the younger generation) began to paint with large brushstrokes that could never blend in the eye of the observer, with pure bold colors (reds, blues, yellows, greens and magentas) "making them as free of the trammels of nature", writes Herbert, "as any painting then being done in Europe."

The work of Paul Cézanne had been greatly influential during the expressionistic phase of proto-Cubism (between 1908 and 1910), while the work of Seurat, with its flatter, more linear structures captured the attention of the Cubists from 1911. Seurat had been the founder of Neo-Impressionism, its most innovative and fervent protagonist, and proved to be one of the most influential in the eyes of the emerging avant-garde; many of whom—such as Jean Metzinger, Robert Delaunay, Gino Severini and Piet Mondrian—transited through a Neo-Impressionist phase, prior to their Fauve, Cubist or Futurist endeavors.

"With the advent of monochromatic Cubism in 1910–1911," writes Herbert, "questions of form displaced color in the artists' attention, and for these Seurat was more relevant. As a result of several exhibitions, his paintings and drawings were easily seen in Paris, and reproductions of his major compositions circulated widely among the Cubists.

Pierre Courthion mentions Parade as "perhaps the sole work of 19th-century painting that unequivocally anticipates Cubism (and even Purism)".

== Provenance ==
The artist until 1891. Inherited by the artist's mother, Mme Ernestine Seurat, Paris, in 1891–92, until at least 1892; the artist's brother and brother-in-law, Emile Seurat and Léon Appert, Paris (until 1900; sold with another work for Fr 1,000 through Félix Fénéon to Bernheim-Jeune); Josse and Gaston Bernheim-Jeune, Paris (1900–c. 1929; sold to Reid & Lefevre); [Reid & Lefevre, London, in 1929; sold in January to Knoedler]; [M. Knoedler & Co., New York, London, and Paris, 1929–32, stock no. A610, sold in November 1932 to Clark]; Stephen C. Clark, New York (1932–d. 1960) his bequest to the Metropolitan Museum of Art, 1960.

== Selected exhibitions ==
- Paris. Salon des Indépendants (4e exposition), Pavillon de la Ville de Paris, 22 March–3 May 1888, no. 614 (as "Parade de cirque," marked for sale).
- Brussels. Musée d'Art Moderne. Neuvième exposition annuelle des XX, 6 February–6 March 1892, no. 10 (lent by Mme Seurat).
- Paris. Salon des Indépendants (8e exposition), Pavillon de la Ville de Paris. 19 March–27 April 1892, no. 1084 (lent by Mme Seurat).
- Paris. Revue Blanche. Georges Seurat (1860 [sic]–1891): Œuvres peintes et dessinées, 19 March–5 April 1900, no. 32.
- Paris. Bernheim-Jeune. Georges Seurat (1859–1891), 14 December 1908 – 9 January 1909, no. 69 (lent by MM. J[osse]. and G[aston]. B[ernheim].-J[eune].).
- Paris. Théâtre de la Cigale. Soirée de Paris: Exposition l'art au théâtre, au music-hall, et au cirque, 17 May–30 June 1924, no. 38 (as "La Parade," lent by MM. Bernheim).
- Paris. Grand Palais des Champs-Élysées. Trente ans d'art indépendant: 1884–1914, 20 February–21 March 1926, no. 3216 (lent by MM. Bernheim-Jeune et cie.).
- Glasgow. Reid & Lefevre, Ltd. Ten Masterpieces by Nineteenth Century French Painters, April 1929, no. 8 (as "La Parade"). London. June–July 1929, no. 7 (as "La Parade").
- New York. Museum of Modern Art. First Loan Exhibition: Cézanne, Gauguin, Seurat, van Gogh, 8 November–7 December 1929, no. 55 (as Side Show [La parade], lent by M. Knoedler and Company, New York, London, and Paris).
- Providence. Rhode Island School of Design. Modern French Art, 11–31 March 1930, no. 36 (lent by M. Knoedler & Co., New York).
- Paris. Galerie Georges Petit. Cent ans de peinture française, 15–30 June 1930, no. 31.
- New York. Knoedler Galleries. Masterpieces by Nineteenth Century French Painters, October–November 1930, no. 11.
- London. Royal Academy of Arts. French Art: 1200–1900, 4 January–12 March 1932, no. 552 (lent by Roland F. Knoedler) [commemorative cat., no. 509].
- San Francisco. California Palace of the Legion of Honor. French Painting from the Fifteenth Century to the Present Day, 8 June–8 July 1934, no. 148 (lent by Mr. Stephen C. Clark, New York).
- Cleveland Museum of Art. Twentieth Anniversary Exhibition, 26 June–4 October 1936, no. 313 (lent by Mr. Stephen C. Clark, New York).
- New York. Museum of Modern Art. Art in Our Time, 10 May–30 September 1939, no. 76 (lent by Stephen C. Clark, New York).
- New York. World's Fair. Masterpieces of Art: European & American Paintings, 1500–1900, May–October 1940, no. 366 (lent by Mr. Stephen C. Clark, New York).
- New York. Century Association. Paintings from the Stephen C. Clark Collection, June 6–September 28, 1946.
- New York. Knoedler Galleries. Seurat, 1859–1891: Paintings and Drawings, 19 April–7 May 1949, no. 22 (lent by Stephen C. Clark, Esq.).
- New York. Solomon R. Guggenheim Museum. Neo-Impressionism, 9 February–7 April 1968, no. 82.
- New York. The Metropolitan Museum of Art. Masterpieces of Fifty Centuries, 15 November 1970 – 15 February 1971, no. 387 (as Invitation to the Side-Show [La parade]).
- Paris. Galeries Nationales du Grand Palais. Seurat, 1859–1891, 9 April–12 August 1991, no. 198.
- New York. Robert Lehman Collection. Neo-Impressionism: The Circle of Paul Signac, 1 October–31 December 2001, no catalogue.
- New York. The Metropolitan Museum of Art. Seurat’s Circus Sideshow. 17 February–29 May 2017; exhibition catalog by Richard Thomson, ISBN 978-1-588-39615-0

== See also ==
- List of paintings by Georges Seurat
