= The Channel of Gravelines, Petit Fort Philippe =

Painting by Georges Seurat

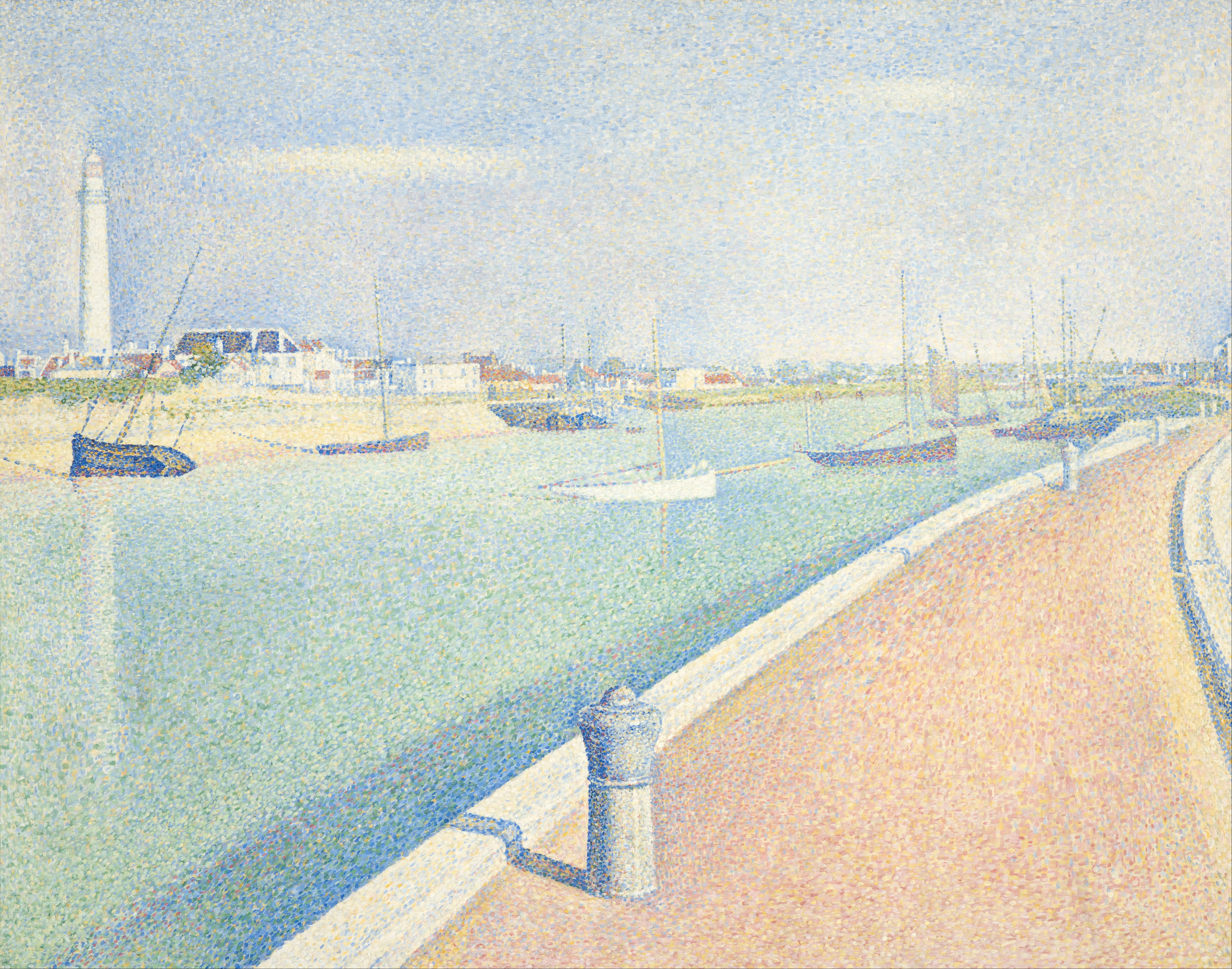
- Artist: Georges Seurat
- Year: 1890
- Type: Oil painting on canvas
- Dimensions: 73.3 cm × 92.7 cm (28 7/8 in × 36 1/2 in)
- Location: Indianapolis Museum of Art, Indianapolis
- Accession: 45.195

The Channel of Gravelines, Petit Fort Philippe is a pointillist painting by French artist Georges Seurat, located in the Indianapolis Museum of Art in Indianapolis, Indiana. Painted in 1890, the year before his death, it depicts a harbor in the small French port of Gravelines. Described as "wistful and poetic," it is one of the treasures of the IMA.

== Description ==
As one of Seurat's final paintings, The Channel of Gravelines, Petit Fort Philippe demonstrates beautifully the principles of Seurat's own Neo-Impressionist movement. His systematic application of dots in colors carefully chosen according to laws of chromatic harmony results in unparalleled luminosity. Seurat painted a narrow border of darker dots around the edge of the canvas, heightening the brilliance of the light. The frame (a reproduction of Seurat's original design) with its vivid ultramarine base and dots echoing the adjacent canvas, enhances the colors still further. In addition to his careful control of the dots' color, Seurat also used their shape and density to achieve his vision. The extremely solid central bollard has the greatest density of dots, while the right side of the sky is so loosely covered that the white ground layer is visible. Based upon the bright light and stark shadows, Seurat painted in midafternoon.

Although Seurat was quite faithful to the actual architecture of the harbor, to the extent that much of it is recognizable to this day, he arrayed the boats so their horizontal and vertical elements resulted in maximum visual stability. The elegant parabola of the wharf induces serenity. Stretching into infinity, it evokes the immensity of the sea. Simultaneously, the sweeping diagonal cutting the composition in two provides contrasting movement.

Seurat's quest for aesthetic perfection can be seen in the number of alterations he made between his initial studies and the final painting. The central bollard anchors the composition securely, so solid as to be nearly graspable, but was missing from the panel study. Comparing the final canvas to the rest of his studies reveals that, in addition to arranging the boats in a neat, calm horizontal line, Seurat also tweaked the walkway to give the channel a greater role in the composition. Thus, sea, sky, and ground occupy roughly equal proportions.

== Historical information ==
While he spent most of the year shocking Paris with his novel style and views, Seurat spent his summers painting wistful seascapes. In 1890, he traveled to the tiny port of Gravelines, near the Belgian border, and painted what would be his last four landscapes. That was two fewer paintings than he had produced the summer previous, perhaps because the broad coastal plain, marked only by dunes, was markedly different from his usual Normandy settings. The rise of the summer vacation meant artists found a ready market for seaside images. Unlike older artists such as Monet, though, Seurat preferred utterly prosaic images of ports and shores, rather than more dramatic sunsets and stormy seas. The complete lack of humans, either vacationers or hardworking fishermen, was typical of Seurat's seascapes, which always had a luminous stillness.

Seurat's choice of Gravelines was somewhat unusual, given that contemporary guidebooks described it as "an uninteresting town." Its very obscurity may have been a draw for the artist, who was growing protective of his methods. Also, its canal's straight lines lent themselves well to the strictly-organized compositions Seurat preferred.

=== Acquisition ===
The painting was donated by Caroline Marmon Fesler in 1945 to the Herron School of Art in memory of her parents, Daniel W. and Elizabeth C. Marmon. It was then claimed by the IMA during the separation of those institutions. It has the acquisition number 45.195.

== See also ==
- List of paintings by Georges Seurat
- Bathers at Asnières
- A Sunday Afternoon on the Island of La Grande Jatte
