= The Lighthouse at Honfleur =

Painting by Georges Seurat

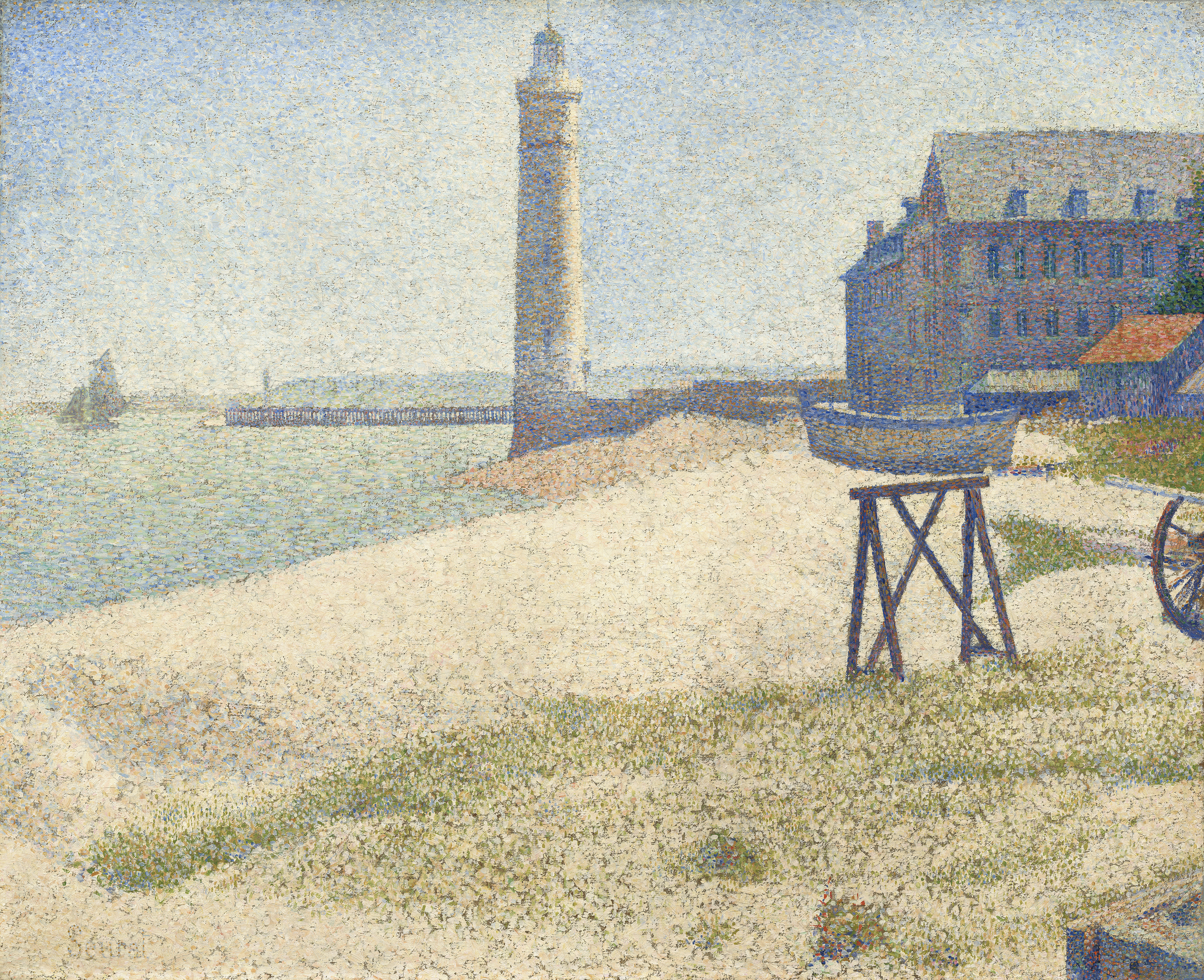
- Artist: Georges Seurat
- Year: 1886
- Type: Oil on canvas, landscape painting
- Dimensions: 66.7 cm × 81.9 cm (26.3 in × 32.2 in)
- Location: National Gallery of Art, Washington D.C.

The Lighthouse at Honfleur is an 1886 landscape painting by the French artist Georges Seurat. It depicts a view of the harbour of Honfleur a coastal resort in Le Havre in Normandy dominated by a lighthouse and jetty. It features the largest of the towns three lighthouses and its western jetty. The painting is also known as The Hospice and the Lighthouse of Honfleur (French: L'Hospice et le Phare de Honfleur).

Seurat was a founder of Neo-Impressionism whose use of Pointillism was a radical departure in modern art. He produced a number of coastal scenes during visits to Normandy, including seven begun on this trip to Honfleur but completed in his Paris studio. Today the painting in the National Gallery of Art in Washington, having been presented by Paul Mellon in 1983.

== See also ==
- List of paintings by Georges Seurat

== Bibliography ==
- Foa, Michelle. Georges Seurat: The Art of Vision. Yale University Press, 2015.
- Hand, John Oliver. National Gallery of Art: Master Paintings from the Collection. National Gallery of Art, 2004.
- Rewald John. Seurat: A Biography. H.N. Abrams, 1990.
