= List of paintings by Georges Seurat =

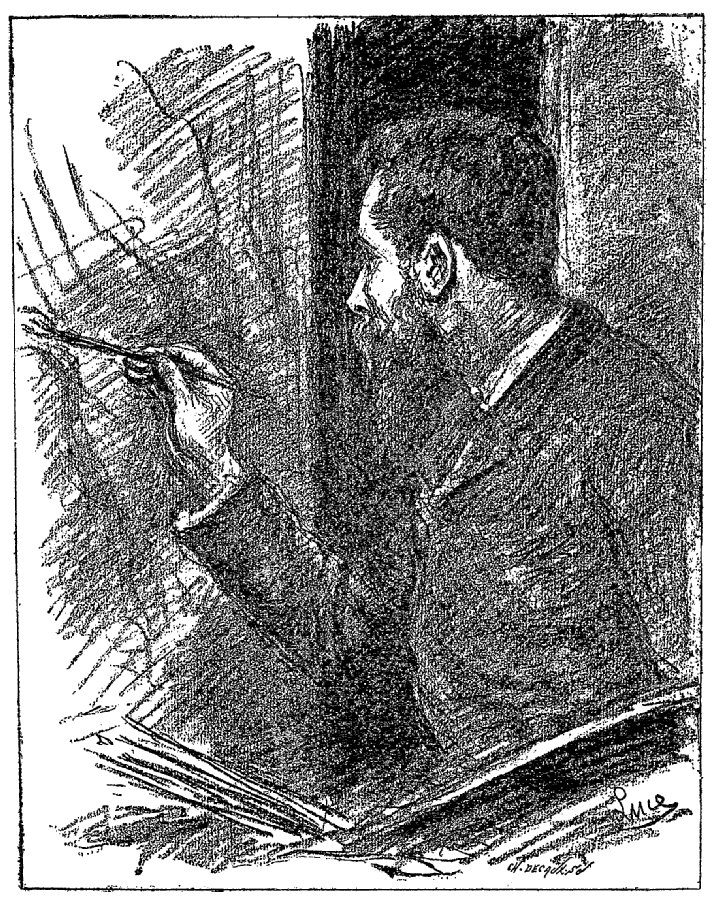
Portrait of Seurat by Maximilien Luce

This is a list of notable paintings by Georges Seurat (2 December 1859 – 29 March 1891). He is a Neo-Impressionist painter and together with Paul Signac noted for being the inventor of pointillism. The listing follows the 1980 book Georges Seurat and uses its catalogue numbers.

== Paintings ==
Image	Year Title	Location	No. H x W in cm Wikimedia
	1859; Born in Paris		
	1878; Angélique	Norton Simon Museum, Pasadena	001; 81.4 × 65; More images
	1878 or 1879; Landscape at Saint-Ouen	Metropolitan Museum of Art, New York City	007; 16.8 × 25.4; More images
	1879; Head of a Young Girl	Dumbarton Oaks Research Library and Collection, Washington D.C.	002; 27.9 × 23.5; More images
	1879; Paysage rose	Musée d'Orsay, Paris	102; 16.5 × 25.5; More images
	1879 to 1881; Vase of Flowers	Fogg Art Museum, Cambridge (Massachusetts)	005; 46.3 × 38.5; More images
	1881; Sunset	Bristol Museum & Art Gallery	009; 15.9 × 25.1; More images
	1881; Landscape with "The Poor Fisherman" by Puvis de Chavannes	Musée d'Orsay, Paris	006; 17.5 × 26.5; More images
	1881 to 1882; The Mower	Metropolitan Museum of Art, New York City	050; 16.5 × 25.1; More images
	1881 to 1882; A man leaning against a Parapet	Metropolitan Museum of Art, New York City	008; 16.5 × 12.4; More images
	1881 to 1882; Trees on the river bank	Unknown	010; 16 × 25; More images
	1881; The Forest at Pontaubert	Metropolitan Museum of Art, New York City	012; 79.1 × 62.5; More images
	1882; Peasants Driving Stakes	Private Collection	013; 14.5 × 24; More images
	1882; Field in Barbizon	Private Collection	016; 15.9 × 24.1; More images
	1882; Forest in Barbizon	Private Collection	018; 20.5 × 30.5; More images
	1882; Summer	Private Collection	019; 32.4 × 39.4; More images
	1882; Forest at sunset	Private Collection	020; 15.9 × 24.8; More images
	1882; Grassy river bank		021; 32 × 40; More images
	1882; Landscape with a stake		022; 38 × 46.1; More images
	1882; Peasant with a Hoe	National Gallery of Art, Washington. D.C.	14.6 × 24.1; More images
	1882 to 1883; Boy sitting in a meadow	Kelvingrove Art Gallery and Museum, Glasgow	025; 65 × 81; More images
	1882; Le Petit Paysan en bleu	Musée d'Orsay, Paris	026; 46 × 38; More images
	1882; Massive figure in a meadow in Barbizon	Wallraf-Richartz-Museum, Cologne	027; 15.5 × 24.8; More images
	1882 to 1883; Farm Women at Work	Solomon R. Guggenheim Museum, New York City	028; 38.5 × 46.2; More images
	1882 to 1883; House and Garden	Virginia Museum of Fine Arts, Richmond (Virginia)	029; 27.6 × 46.3; More images
	1882 to 1883; White houses in Ville d'Avray	Walker Art Gallery, Liverpool	030; 33 × 46; More images
	1882 to 1883; Landscape in the Île-de-France	Musée des beaux-arts de Bordeaux	031; 32.5 × 40.7; More images
	1882 to 1883; Man with a Hoe	National Gallery of Art, Washington. D.C.	034; 15.5 × 24.7; More images
	1882 to 1883; The Stone breaker	National Gallery of Art, Washington. D.C.	035; 14.6 × 24.1; More images
	1882 to 1883; Topless Stonebreaker	Private Collection	036; 16.7 × 26; More images
	1882 to 1883; Stonebreaker From the Back	Private Collection	037; 16.7 × 26; More images
	1882; The Stone Breakers, Le Raincy	Norton Simon Museum, Pasadena	039; 36 × 45; More images
	1882 to 1883; Three Stonebreakers	Private Collection	040; 17.1 × 25.4; More images
	1882 to 1883; Two stonebreakers	Yale University Art Gallery, New Haven, Connecticut	041; 16.2 × 25.1; More images
	1882; Haymakers at Montfermeil	National Gallery of Art, Washington. D.C.	042; 15.6 × 24.7; More images
	1882; The Stone Breaker	Phillips Collection, Washington D.C.	046; 15.6 × 24.8; More images
	1882 to 1883; The Gardener	Metropolitan Museum of Art, New York City	047; 15.9 × 24.8; More images
	1882; Peasant with Hoe	Solomon R. Guggenheim Museum, New York City	048; 46.3 × 56.1; More images
	1882; Haystacks	National Gallery of Art, Washington. D.C.	15.9 × 24.7; More images
	1882 to 1883; View of the Seine	Metropolitan Museum of Art, New York City	081; 15.9 × 24.8; More images
	1882 to 1883; Stonebreaker	Private Collection	033; 15.8 × 24.7; More images
	1883; Landscape near Paris	Private Collection	060; 15.9 × 24.8; More images
	1883; Peasant Woman Seated in the Grass	Solomon R. Guggenheim Museum, New York City	024; 38.1 × 46.2; More images
	1883; Two Stonebreakers	Private Collection	045; 32 × 40; More images
	1883; Farmer at work	Private Collection	049; 15.8 × 25.4; More images
	1883; Horse with carriage in a meadow	Private Collection	051; 16 × 24; More images
	1883; The team	Private Collection	052; 32.4 × 41; More images
	1883; Cow in the pasture	Yale University Art Gallery, New Haven, Connecticut	054; 16.1 × 25; More images
	1883; Cows in a meadow	Private Collection	055; 15.5 × 24; More images
	1883; Figures in a Landscape	National Gallery of Art, Washington. D.C.	056; 15.2 × 24.8; More images
	1883; A Summer Landscape	National Gallery of Art, Washington. D.C.	057; 16 × 25; More images
	1883; Arbres, hiver	Musée d'Orsay, Paris	061; 15.4 × 25; More images
	1883; Lisière de bois au printemps	Musée d'Orsay, Paris	062; 16.5 × 26; More images
	1883 to 1884; The Seine at Courbevoie	Van Gogh Museum, Amsterdam	101; 15.5 × 24.5; More images
	1883; Around the Town	Hiroshima Museum of Art	063; 15.6 × 24.9; More images
	1883; House with a red roof	Private Collection	064; 16.2 × 25; More images
	1883; Houses between trees	Kelvingrove Art Gallery and Museum, Glasgow	065; 16.5 × 25.4; More images
	1883; Watering can at Le Raincy	National Gallery of Art, Washington. D.C.	066; 24.4 × 15.5; More images
	1883; Suburb	Musée d'art moderne de Troyes	067; 32.4 × 40.6; More images
	1883; Snow Effect	Private Collection	069; 16.2 × 25.1; More images
	1883; Figures on a street	Wallraf-Richartz-Museum, Cologne	071; 15.6 × 24.7; More images
	1883; Man painting a boat	National Gallery, London	072; 15.8 × 24.7; More images
	1883; Man in a boat	Courtauld Institute of Art, London	073; 115.2 × 24.1; More images
	1883; A Fisherman	Yale University Art Gallery, New Haven, Connecticut	074; 16.2 × 24.8; More images
	1883; Banks of the Seine near Courbevoie	The Hyde Collection, Glens Falls	077; 15.5 × 24.5; More images
	1883; Allée en forêt, Barbizon	Musée d'Orsay, Paris	16.3 × 25.5; More images
	1883; A River Bank (The Seine at Asnières)	The National Gallery, London	078; 15.9 × 25; More images
	1883; Houses on the banks of the Seine	Private Collection	079; 15.7 × 25.1; More images
	1883; Boat by the Bank, Asnieres	Courtauld Institute of Art, London	080; 15 × 24; More images
	1883; Fishermen on the banks of the Seine	Musée d'art moderne de Troyes	082; 16.2 × 24.8; More images
	1883; Banks of the Seine	Kelvingrove Art Gallery and Museum, Glasgow	083; 15.9 × 24.8; More images
	1883; Horse and Boats	National Gallery of Art, Washington. D.C.	086; 15.5 × 25; More images
	1883; White horse and black horse in the water	Private Collection	087; 15.2 × 24.8; More images
	1883; Bathers	National Gallery of Art, Washington. D.C.	088; 15.9 × 25.1; More images
	1883; The Rainbow	National Gallery, London	089; 15.5 × 24.5; More images
	1883; Sitting Man on the Banks of the Seine	Cleveland Museum of Art, Cleveland	090; 15.7 × 24.9; More images
	1883; Five Male Figures	National Gallery, London	091; 15.8 × 24.7; More images
	1883; Clothes on the Grass	National Gallery, London	092; 16.2 × 24.8; More images
	1883; The Seine with Clothing on the Bank	National Gallery of Art, Washington. D.C.	093; 17.5 × 26.3; More images
	1883; Boy with Horse near Asnières	Scottish National Gallery, Edinburgh	094; 15.9 × 25; More images
	1883; Figure on the banks of the Seine and bathers	Musée d'Orsay, Paris	095; 15.5 × 25; More images
	1883; Bathers sitting on the Beach of the Seine	Nelson-Atkins Museum of Art, Kansas City, Missouri	096; 17.5 × 26.4; More images
	1883; Final Study for "Bathers at Asnières"	Art Institute of Chicago	097; 15.8 × 25.1; More images
	1884; Bathers at Asnières	National Gallery, London	098; 201 × 300; More images
	1884; Pierrot with pipe (Aman-Jean)	Private Collection	100; 32 × 24; More images
	1884; The Banks of the Seine	Unknown	103; 15.8 × 24.5; More images
	1884; House Corner	Private Collection	105; 24.1 × 14.6; More images
	1884; The Rue St Vincent, Paris in Spring	Fitzwilliam Museum, Cambridge	106; 24.7 × 15.5; More images
	1884; The bridge at Bineau	Nationalmuseum, Stockholm	107; 14.5 × 24; More images
	1884 to 1885; Study for La Grande Jatte	National Gallery of Art, Washington. D.C.	110; 15.8 × 24.8; More images
	1884 to 1885; Figures on the banks of the Seine and in the boat	Private Collection	111; 16.5 × 24.4; More images
	1884 to 1885; Two women on the banks of the Seine	Private Collection	113; 16.2 × 22.5; More images
	1884 to 1885; Seated figure on the banks of the Seine	Private Collection	114; 16 × 24; More images
	1884; Study for A Sunday on La Grande Jatte	Metropolitan Museum of Art, New York City	115; 15.6 × 24.1; More images
	1884 to 1885; Figures on the banks of the Seine	National Gallery, London	116; 16 × 25; More images
	1884; Seated male and reclining female figure	Musée d'Orsay, Paris	117; 15.5 × 25; More images
	1884 to 1885; Woman in rose-colored skirt and other figures	Private Collection	118; 15.6 × 24.4; More images
	1884 to 1885; Figures and Girl in White	Barnes Foundation, Philadelphia	119; 15.4 × 24.8; More images
	1884 to 1886; Seated figures and woman with large hat	Musée d'Orsay, Paris	120; 16 × 25; More images
	1884 to 1885; Sitting figures and white dog	Private Collection	121; 15.5 × 25; More images
	1884 to 1885; Three seated figures in profile	Private Collection	122; 15.8 × 25.1; More images
	1884 to 1885; A fisherman	Private Collection	123; 24.1 × 15.2; More images
	1884 to 1885; Woman sitting in the foreground	Private Collection	126; 15.6 × 25; More images
	1884 to 1885; Study for La Grande Jatte	National Gallery, London	127; 17.5 × 26; More images
	1884; Oil Sketch for La Grande Jatte	Art Institute of Chicago	128; 15.5 × 24.326; More images
	1884 to 1885; Study for La Grande-Jatte	Stiftung Sammlung E. G. Bührle, Zürich	129; 15.6 × 25.2; More images
	1884; View of the Grande Jatte	Minnesota Marine Art Museum, Winona	130; 65 × 81.5; More images
	1884 to 1885; Seated Figures	Fogg Art Museum, Cambridge (Massachusetts)	131; 15.4 × 24.9; More images
	1884 to 1885; Woman sitting in the foreground and boat	Albright-Knox Art Gallery, Buffalo	132; 15.6 × 24.8; More images
	1884 to 1885; Cadet from Saint-Cyr	Private Collection	133; 15.9 × 24.8; More images
	1884 to 1885; Sewing woman	Private Collection	134; 15.5 × 25.1; More images
	1884 to 1885; Groups of people and two women with umbrellas	Private Collection	135; 15.9 × 24.8; More images
	1884 to 1885; Study of Figures for La Grande Jatte	National Gallery of Art, Washington. D.C.	15.2 × 24.1; More images
	1884 to 1885; Woman with parasol	Private Collection	137; 25.1 × 15.5; More images
	1884; Walk with Monkey	Smith College Museum of Art, Northampton (Massachusetts)	138; 24.8 × 15.9; More images
	1884 to 1885; Promenading Couple	Fitzwilliam Museum, Cambridge, on permanent loan from the King's College (Cambridge)	140; 81.5 × 65.2; More images
	1884; Final study for La Grande Jatte	Metropolitan Museum of Art, New York City	141; 70.5 × 104.1; More images
	1884 to 1886; A Sunday Afternoon on the Island of La Grande Jatte	Art Institute of Chicago	142; 207.5 × 308.1; More images
	1884 to 1885; La Luzerne, Saint-Denis	Scottish National Gallery, Edinburgh	145; 65.3 × 81.3; More images
	1885; Landscape	Palais des Beaux-Arts de Lille	143; 16 × 24; More images
	1885; Beach at Grandchamp	Private Collection	146; 16 × 25; More images
	1885; Two Sailboats at Grandcamp	Barnes Foundation, Philadelphia	149; 15.8 × 25; More images
	1885; Four boats at Grandcamp	Barnes Foundation, Philadelphia	150; 16 × 25; More images
	1885; Mill ruin at Grandchamp	Musée d'Orsay, Paris	151; 15.7 × 25; More images
	1885; Three boats and a sailor at Grandchamp	Private Collection	153; 15.9 × 25.3; More images
	1885; Boats at low tide at Grandchamp	Pola Museum of Art, Hakone	155; 66 × 82; More images
	1885; Study for "Fort-Samson, Grandchamp"	Private Collection	156; 15.2 × 24.7; More images
	1885; Fort-Samson, Grandchamp	Hermitage Museum, Saint Petersburg	157; 65 × 81.5; More images
	1885; Study for "Le Bec du Hoc, Grandchamp"	National Gallery of Australia, Canberra	158; 16.2 × 25.2; More images
	1885; Le Bec du Hoc, Grandchamp	National Gallery, London, on permanent loan from the Tate Gallery	159; 64.8 × 81.6; More images
	1885; The roadstead at Grandchamp	Private Collection	160; 65 × 81.2; More images
	1885; Grandchamp, Evening	Museum of Modern Art, New York City	161; 66.2 × 82.4; More images
	1885; The Morning Walk, Study for "The Seine at Courbevoie"	National Gallery, London	163; 24.9 × 15.7; More images
	1885; The Seine at Courbevoie	Private Collection	162; 81 × 65; More images
	1886; Harbour at Honfleur	Kröller-Müller Museum, Otterlo	165; 79.5 × 63; More images
	1886; The Mary in Honfleur	National Gallery Prague	166; 53 × 63.5; More images
	1886; Honfleur, evening	Museum of Modern Art, New York City	168; 78.3 × 94; More images
	1886; Study for "The Beach of Bas-Butin, Honfleur"	Baltimore Museum of Art	169; 17.1 × 26; More images
	1886; The Beach of Bas-Butin, Honfleur	Musée des Beaux-Arts, Tournai	170; 67 × 78; More images
	1886; Harbour entrance at Honfleur	Kröller-Müller Museum, Otterlo	171; 46 × 55; More images
	1886; The Honfleur harbor entrance	Barnes Foundation, Philadelphia	172; 54.3 × 65.1; More images
	1886; Study for "Hospice and lighthouse in Honfleur"	Private Collection	173; 15.8 × 25; More images
	1886; The Lighthouse at Honfleur	National Gallery of Art, Washington. D.C.	174; 65 × 81.5; More images
	1886 to 1888; Gray Weather, Grande Jatte	Metropolitan Museum of Art, New York City	178; 70.5 × 86.4; More images
	1886 to 1887; The Bridge at Courbevoie	Courtauld Institute of Art, London	179; 46.4 × 55.3; More images
	1887; A paddle boat seen through trees	Private Collection	175; 15.6 × 25; More images
	1887; Les Poseuses, Study of a standing model from the front	Musée d'Orsay, Paris	180; 25 × 15.7; More images
	1887 to 1890; Les Poseuses, Study of a standing model	Musée d'Orsay, Paris	181; 25 × 15.8; More images
	1887; Les Poseuses, Study of a seated model in profile	Musée d'Orsay, Paris	182; 24.7 × 15.5; More images
	1887; Les Poseuses, Study of a model from behind	Musée d'Orsay, Paris	183; 24.3 × 15.3; More images
	1886 to 1888; Les Poseuses	Barnes Foundation, Philadelphia	185; 200 × 249.9; More images
	1888; Les Poseuses (Small version)	Private Collection	186; 39.4 × 48.7; More images
	1888; The Seine seen from La Grande Jatte	National Gallery, London	176; 15.7 × 25; More images
	1888; La Seine à la Grande-Jatte	Royal Museums of Fine Arts, Brussels	177; 65 × 82; More images
	1887; Study for "The Circus Parade"	Stiftung Sammlung E. G. Bührle, Zürich	187; 16.5 × 26; More images
	1887 to 1888; The Circus Parade	Metropolitan Museum of Art, New York City	188; 99.7 × 149.9; More images
	1888; Port-en-Bessin. Bridge and quays	Minneapolis Institute of Art	189; 64.9 × 82.4; More images
	1888; Seascape at Port-en-Bessin, Normandy	National Gallery of Art, Washington. D.C.	190; 64.9 × 82.4; More images
	1888; Port-en-Bessin: The Outer Harbor (Low Tide)	Saint Louis Art Museum	191; 54.3 × 66.7; More images
	1888; View of Port-en-Bessin, Sunday	Kröller-Müller Museum, Otterlo	192; 66 × 82; More images
	1888; Port-en-Bessin, Harbour Entrance	Museum of Modern Art, New York City	193; 54.93 × 65.1; More images
	1888; Port-en-Bessin, Port entrance at high tide	Musée d'Orsay, Paris	194; 66 × 82; More images
	1889; View of Le Crotoy, from Upstream	Detroit Institute of Arts	195; 70.5 × 86.7; More images
	1889; View of Crotoy, the Valley	Private Collection	196; 70.5 × 86.4; More images
	1889; The Eiffel Tower	Fine Arts Museums of San Francisco	197; 24.1 × 15.2; More images
	1889; Study for Young Woman Powdering Herself	Museum of Fine Arts, Houston	198; 24.8 × 16; More images
	1888 to 1890; Young Woman Powdering Herself	Courtauld Institute of Art, London	199; 95.5 × 79.5; More images
	1889; Étude pour Le Chahut	Albright-Knox Art Gallery, Buffalo	201; 55.3 × 47; More images
	1890; Study for "Le Chahut"	Courtauld Institute of Art, London	200; 21.8 × 15.8; More images
	1889 to 1890; Le Chahut	Kröller-Müller Museum, Otterlo	202; 169.1 × 141; More images
	1890; L'homme à femmes	Barnes Foundation, Philadelphia	203; 25 × 16; More images
	1890; Moored boats and trees at gravelines	Philadelphia Museum of Art, Philadelphia	204; 16 × 25.5; More images
	1890; Seascape at Gravelines	National Gallery of Art, Washington. D.C.	206; 15.9 × 25.1; More images
	1890; Beach at Gravelines	Courtauld Institute of Art, London	207; 16 × 25.5; More images
	1890; Study for "The Channel of Gravelines, Petit Fort Philippe"	Nelson-Atkins Museum of Art, Kansas City, Missouri	208; 15.9 × 25; More images
	1890; The Channel of Gravelines, Petit Fort Philippe	Indianapolis Museum of Art, Indianapolis	209; 73 × 92; More images
	1890; Gravelines. Grand Fort Philippe	National Gallery, London	210; 65 × 81; More images
	1890; The Channel at Gravelines, in the Direction of the Sea	Kröller-Müller Museum, Otterlo	211; 73 × 92.7; More images
	1890; Study for "The Channel at Gravelines, Evening"	Musée de l'Annonciade, Saint-Tropez	212; 16 × 25; More images
	1890; The Channel at Gravelines, Evening	Museum of Modern Art, New York City	213; 65.4 × 81.9; More images
	1891; Study for "The Circus"	Musée d'Orsay, Paris	214; 55.2 × 46.2; More images
	1891; The Circus	Musée d'Orsay, Paris	215; 186 × 152; More images
	1891; Died in Paris		

== Museums ==
- Albright-Knox Art Gallery, Buffalo
- Art Institute of Chicago, Chicago
- Baltimore Museum of Art
- Barnes Foundation, Philadelphia
- Bristol Museum & Art Gallery, Bristol
- Cleveland Museum of Art, Cleveland
- Courtauld Institute of Art, London
- Dallas Museum of Art, Dallas
- Detroit Institute of Arts
- Dumbarton Oaks Research Library and Collection, Washington. D.C.
- Fine Arts Museums of San Francisco
- Fogg Art Museum, Cambridge (Massachusetts)
- Hermitage Museum, Saint Petersburg
- Indianapolis Museum of Art, Indianapolis
- Hiroshima Museum of Art, Hiroshima
- Kelvingrove Art Gallery and Museum, Glasgow
- Kröller-Müller Museum, Otterlo
- Kunsthaus Zürich
- Kunstmuseum Basel
- Metropolitan Museum of Art, New York City
- Museum of Modern Art, New York City
- Minneapolis Institute of Art
- Minnesota Marine Art Museum, Winona, Minnesota
- Musée d'art moderne de Troyes
- Musée d'Orsay, Paris
- fr:Musée de l'Annonciade, Saint-Tropez
- Musée des beaux-arts de Bordeaux
- Musée des Beaux-Arts, Tournai
- Nationalmuseum, Stockholm
- National Gallery, London
- National Gallery of Art, Washington, D.C.
- National Gallery of Australia, Canberra
- National Gallery Prague
- Nelson-Atkins Museum of Art, Kansas City, Missouri
- Norton Simon Museum, Pasadena, California
- Palais des Beaux-Arts de Lille
- Philadelphia Museum of Art, Philadelphia
- Phillips Collection, Washington D.C.
- Pola Museum of Art, Hakone
- Royal Museums of Fine Arts of Belgium, Brussels
- Saint Louis Art Museum
- Scottish National Gallery, Edinburgh
- Smith College Museum of Art, Northampton (Massachusetts)
- Solomon R. Guggenheim Museum, New York City
- Stiftung Sammlung E. G. Bührle, Zürich
- Tate Gallery
- The Hyde Collection, Glens Falls
- Van Gogh Museum, Amsterdam
- Virginia Museum of Fine Arts, Richmond (Virginia)
- Walker Art Gallery, Liverpool
- Wallraf-Richartz-Museum, Cologne
- Yale University Art Gallery, New Haven, Connecticut

== See also ==
- Bathers at Asnières (1884)
- A Sunday Afternoon on the Island of La Grande Jatte (1884–1886)
- Models (1884–1886)
- Parade de cirque (1887–1888)
- Young Woman Powdering Herself (1889–1890)
- Le Chahut (1889–1890)
- The Channel of Gravelines, Petit Fort Philippe (1890)
- The Circus (1890–1891)
