= Models (painting) =

Painting by Georges Seurat

The Models
- The Three Models
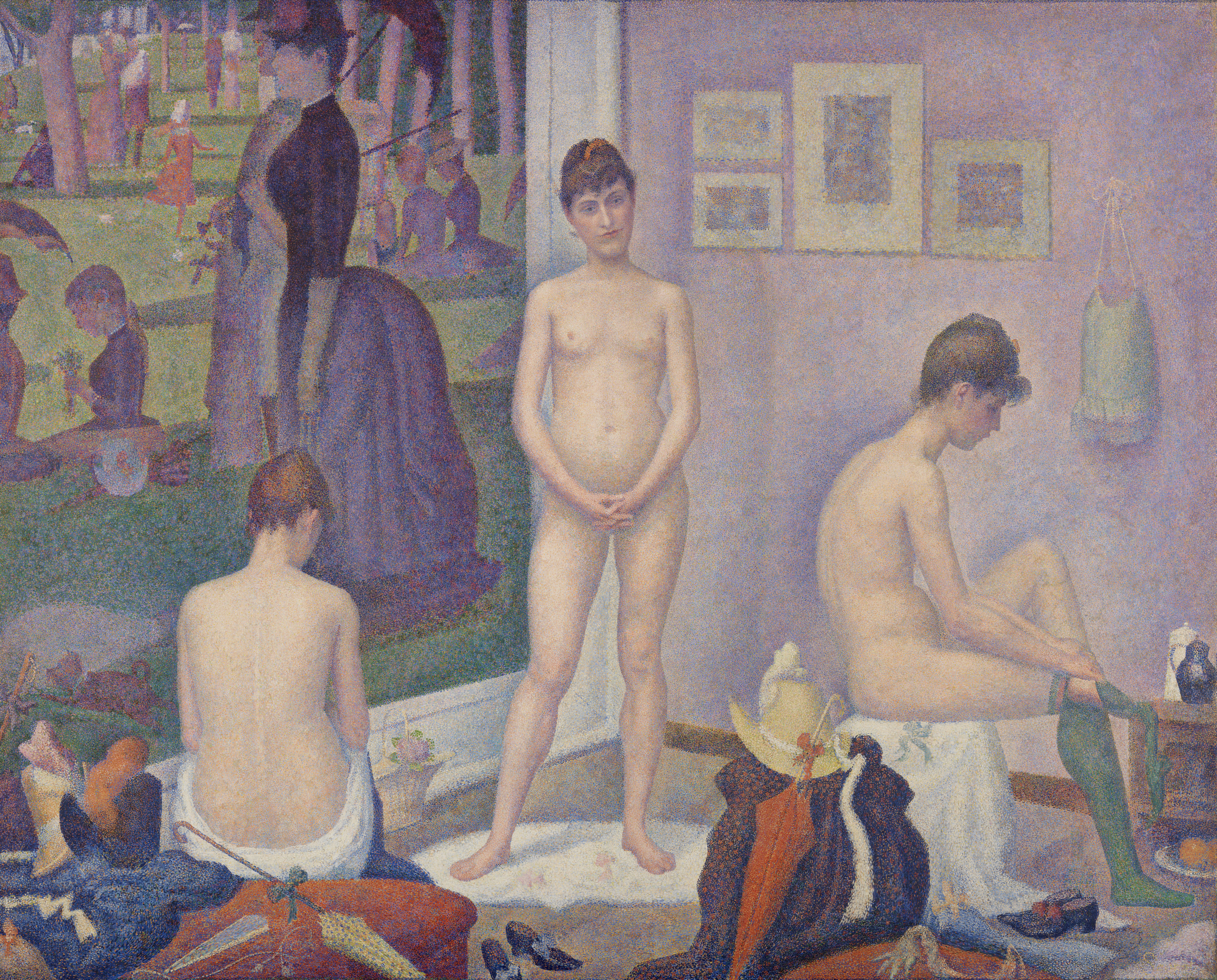
- Artist: Georges Seurat
- Year: 1886
- Medium: oil paint, canvas
- Dimensions: 200 cm (79 in) × 249.9 cm (98.4 in)
- Location: Barnes Foundation, Philadelphia, PA
- Accession: BF811

Models, also known as The Three Models and Les Poseuses, is a work by Georges Seurat, painted between 1886 and 1888 and held by the Barnes Foundation in Philadelphia. Models was exhibited at the fourth Salon des Indépendants in spring of 1888.

The piece, the third of Seurat's six major works, is a response to critics who deemed Seurat's technique inferior for being cold and unable to represent life. As a response, the artist offered a nude depiction of the same model in three different poses. In the left background is part of Seurat's 1884–1886 painting A Sunday Afternoon on the Island of La Grande Jatte.

Models is considered distinctive because of its pointillist technique and the political implications of its depiction of the nude female body.

== Seurat's life ==
Georges-Pierre Seurat was the third child of Ernestine Faivre and Antoine-Chrysostome Seurat. He was born in Paris on 2 December 1859 into a bourgeois family. He entered in the École des Beaux-Arts in 1878. He then studied under Henri Lehman. He, along with artists such as Paul Signac, Albert Dubois-Pilllet, and Odilon Redon were responsible for the Salon des Indépendants, which they established as an alternative to the state-sponsored Salon exhibitions.

Seurat is best-known for A Sunday Afternoon on the Island of La Grande Jatte, 1884, which was displayed in 1886 at the final Impressionist exhibition and subsequently exhibited at the Salon des Indépendants. The painting is known to be the start of Neo-Impressionist movement. Seurat is also praised for his technique of pointillism which in an almost scientific manner breaks the paint surface into dots of color that blend together when seen from afar.

== Pointillism and color theory ==
Models is a notable example of Pointillism, which refers to painting through a series of colored dots that together make up an image, although Seurat's preferred to call it Chromo-luminarism.

In an article written by Norma Broude in the Art Bulletin, she compares Pointillism to photo printing in the 1880s France. Though not the same, there are large similarities in the results given the preoccupation with color theory and the meticulously planning of paint application in pointillism. In his works, Seurat adopted the approach to replicate the luminosity and tones found in nature. Seurat's faith in color science, use of bright colors, and mechanical brush strokes are characteristic of Neo-Impressionism.

== Les Poseuses ==
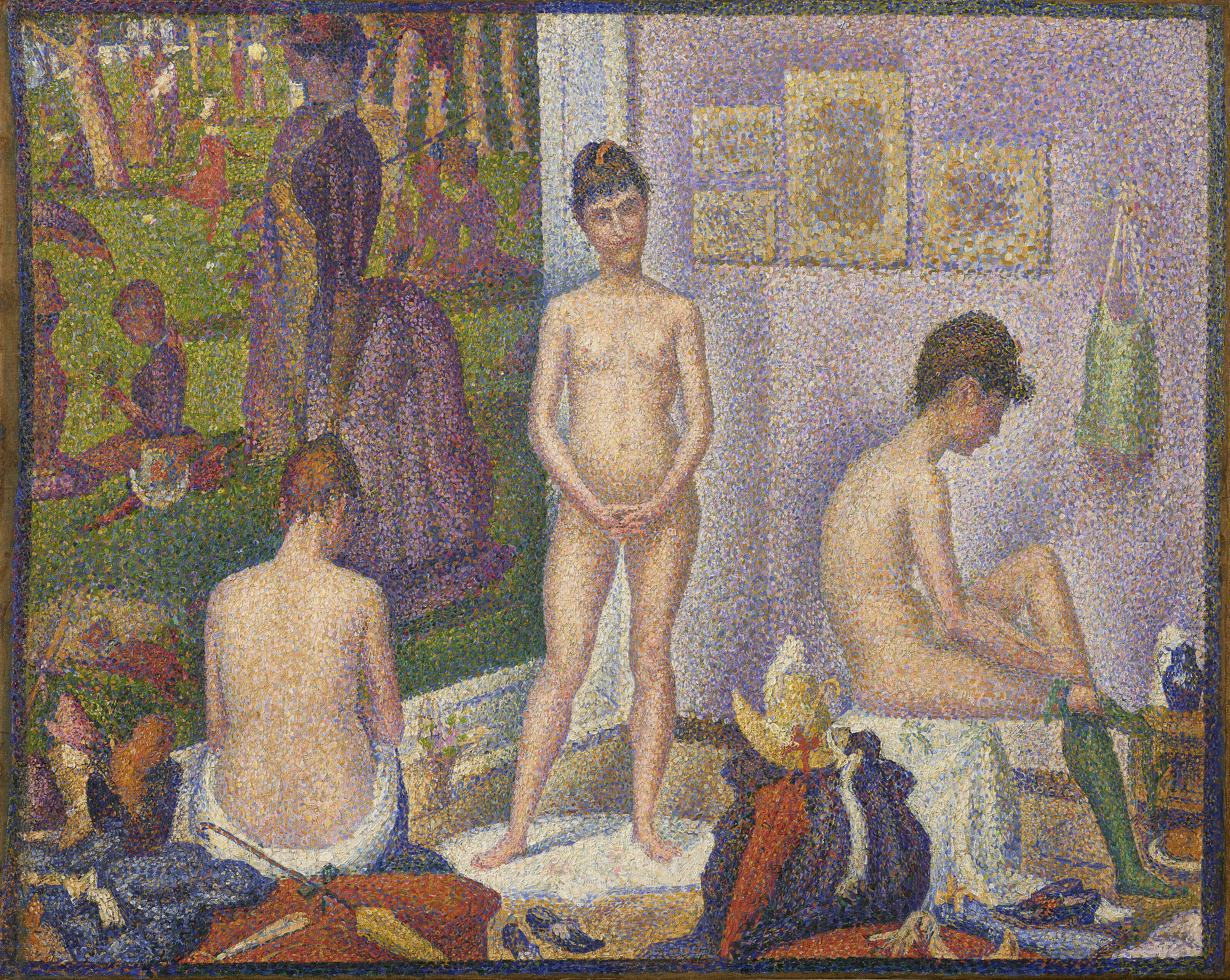
Les Poseuses, Ensemble (Petite version)

Seurat painted two versions of Les Poseuses. The smaller of the two is more in accord with the divisionism technique that Seurat had invented, and favoured by Seurat specialists. This version is on the cover of the catalogue for the 1991 Seurat exhibition at the Metropolitan Museum of Art. Though the painting once belonged to the merchant Heinz Berggruen, it went on to become part of the Paul Allen collection and then his estate. In 1947, at the sale of the collection of Félix Fénéon, an early advocate and promoter of Seurat, France acquired studies for the painting that now reside in the Musée d'Orsay. In November 2022, Christies auction house sold the painting as part of the Paul G. Allen collection auction for $149.2m (£131m), including fees.

Painted between 1886 and 1888, Les Poseuses was Seurat’s response to criticism of his painting A Sunday Afternoon on the Island of La Grande Jatte. Critics at the time had claimed that the painting did not depict figures with sufficient realism. Les Poseuses has sometimes been interpreted as a response to this criticism, and the inclusion of A Sunday Afternoon on the Island of La Grande Jatte in the composition serves to connect the works. The incorporation of the earlier canvas within the picture also serves to make clear that the models are seen in the setting of the studio.

Les Poseuses roughly translate as "the posers," and the typical English translation of the title as "Models" obscures some of its original meaning. The title establishes a contrast with the subject of the painting, in which models appear to be off duty, not in the process of posing. Seurat painted the figures without idealizing them. By showing the banal realities of their work as models, he heightens the sense of their realness. They are not models in the sense of muses, but they are women who are earning money. Scholars have suggested that this approach complicates the traditional way that women have been objectified in painting.

The large size of the painting also challenged long-standing art historical traditions. In academic painting, larger canvases were typically reserved for history paintings, which aimed to depict mythological, religious, or historical scenes and events. Genre paintings, which tended to represent scenes of daily life, were usually smaller in scale. Seurat enlarged a banal and casual scene to the dimensions of a history painting, thereby subverting the traditional hierarchy.

The women's poses may also allude to earlier and widely-recognized paintings, such as Édouard Manet's 1863 Luncheon on the Grass or Jean-Auguste-Dominique Ingres's 1808 The Valpinçon Bather.

Furthermore, the English art critic Waldemar Januszczak believes this painting breaks the fourth wall, offering a glimpse into the poser who is the original source of the women depicted in A Sunday Afternoon on the Island of La Grand Jatte. He also points out that the model used for Les Poseuses may also be the same one used for the largest figure in La Grande Jatte; and that the hat and clothing worn by the rightmost, seated woman in La Grande Jatte may also appear in Les Poseuses.

== Gallery ==
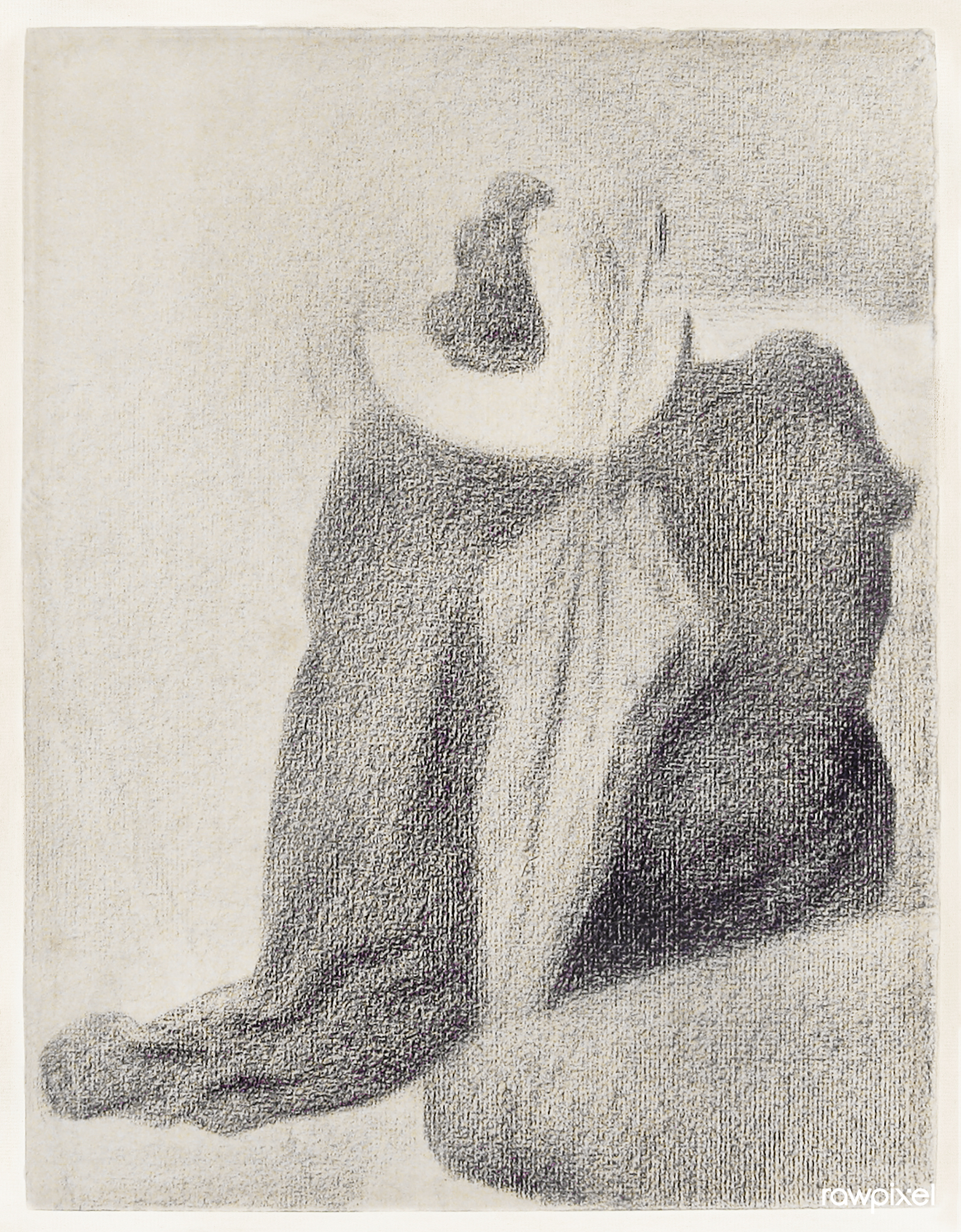
Still Life With Hat, Parasol, and Clothes on a Chair (study)

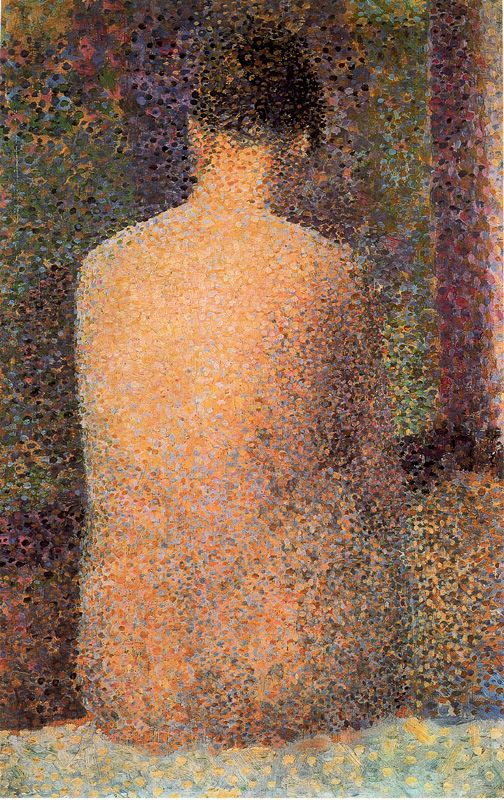
Poseuse de dos
(study)

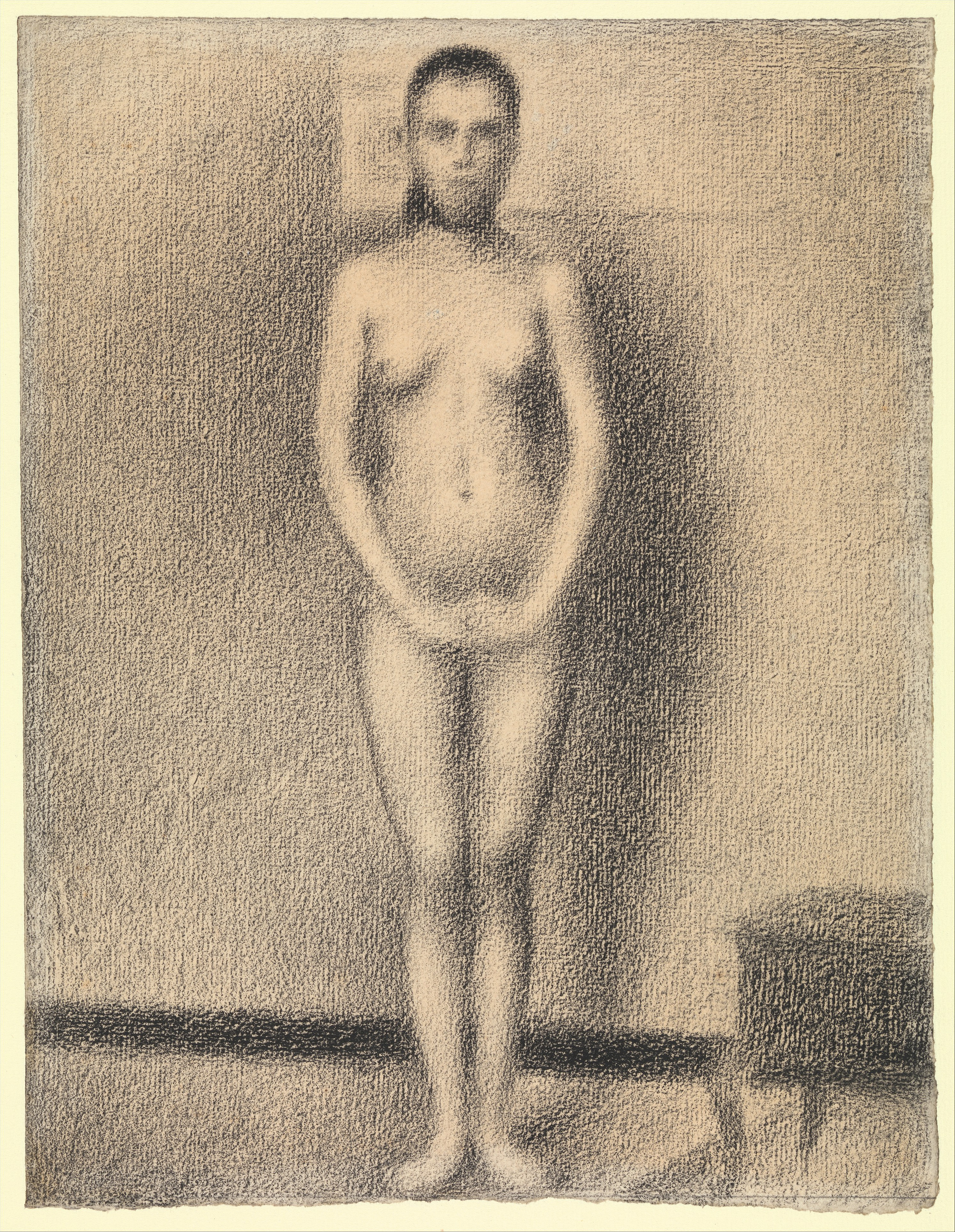
Study for Poseuses

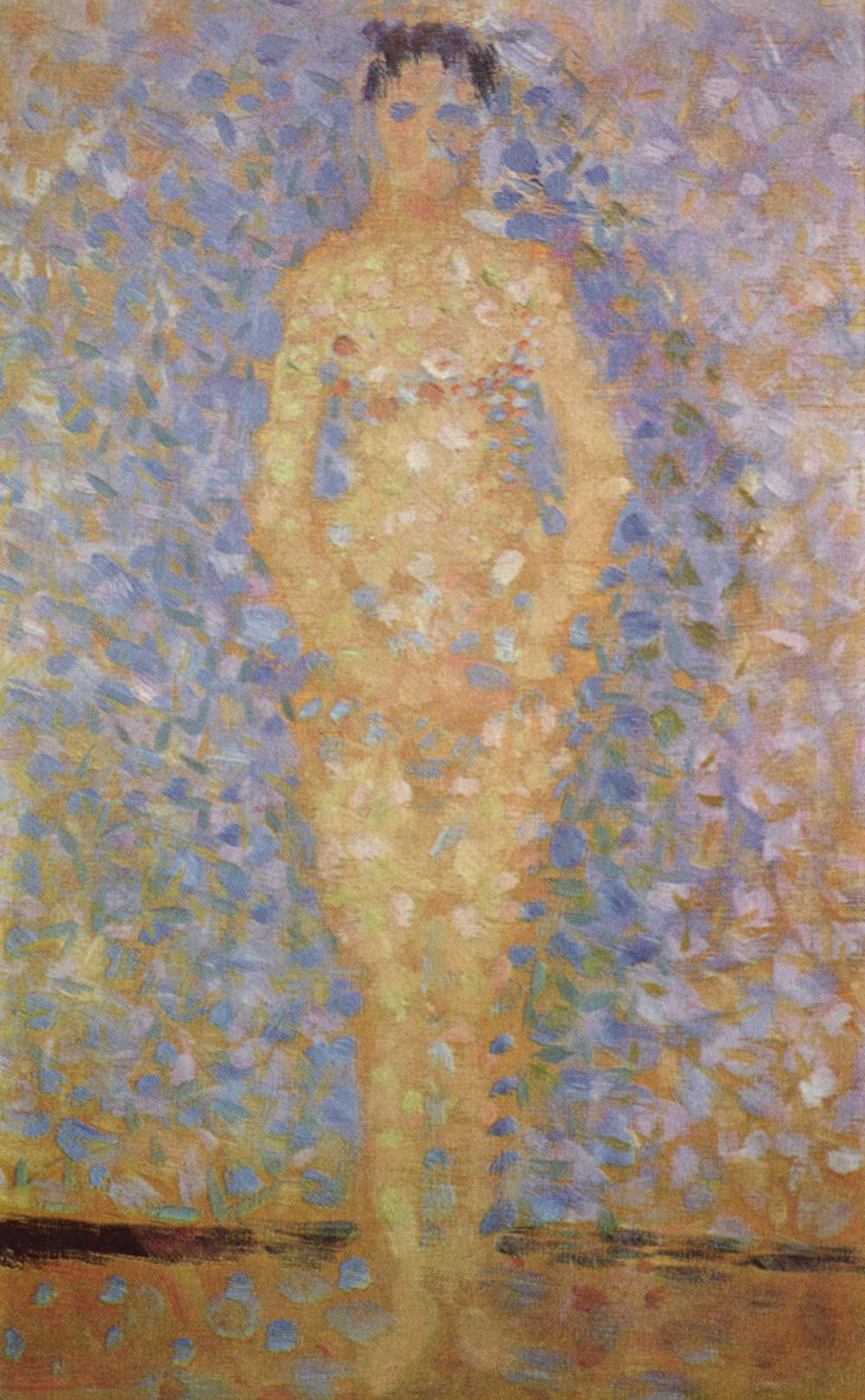
Poseuse debout, de face (study)

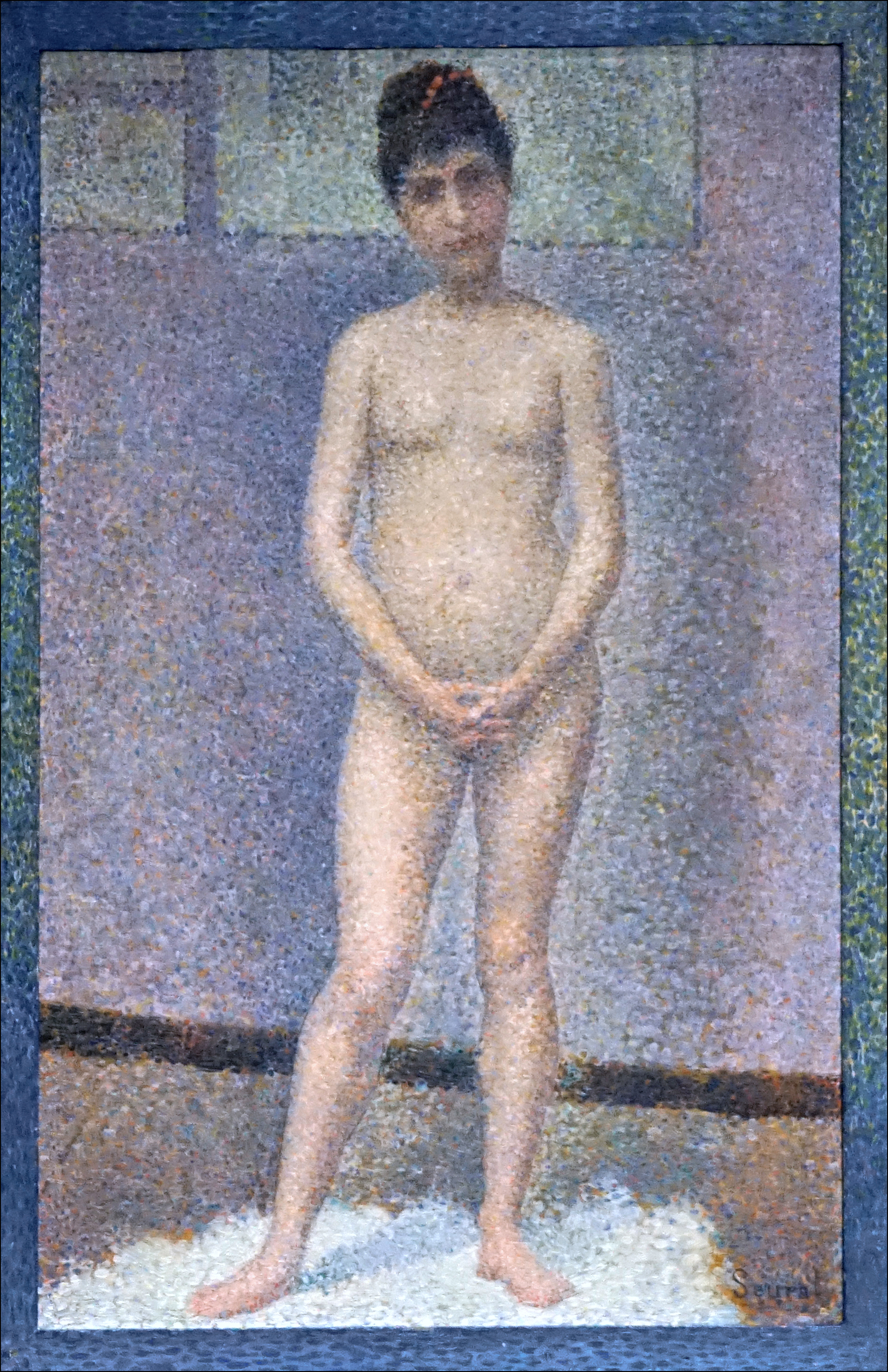
Poseuse de face
(study)

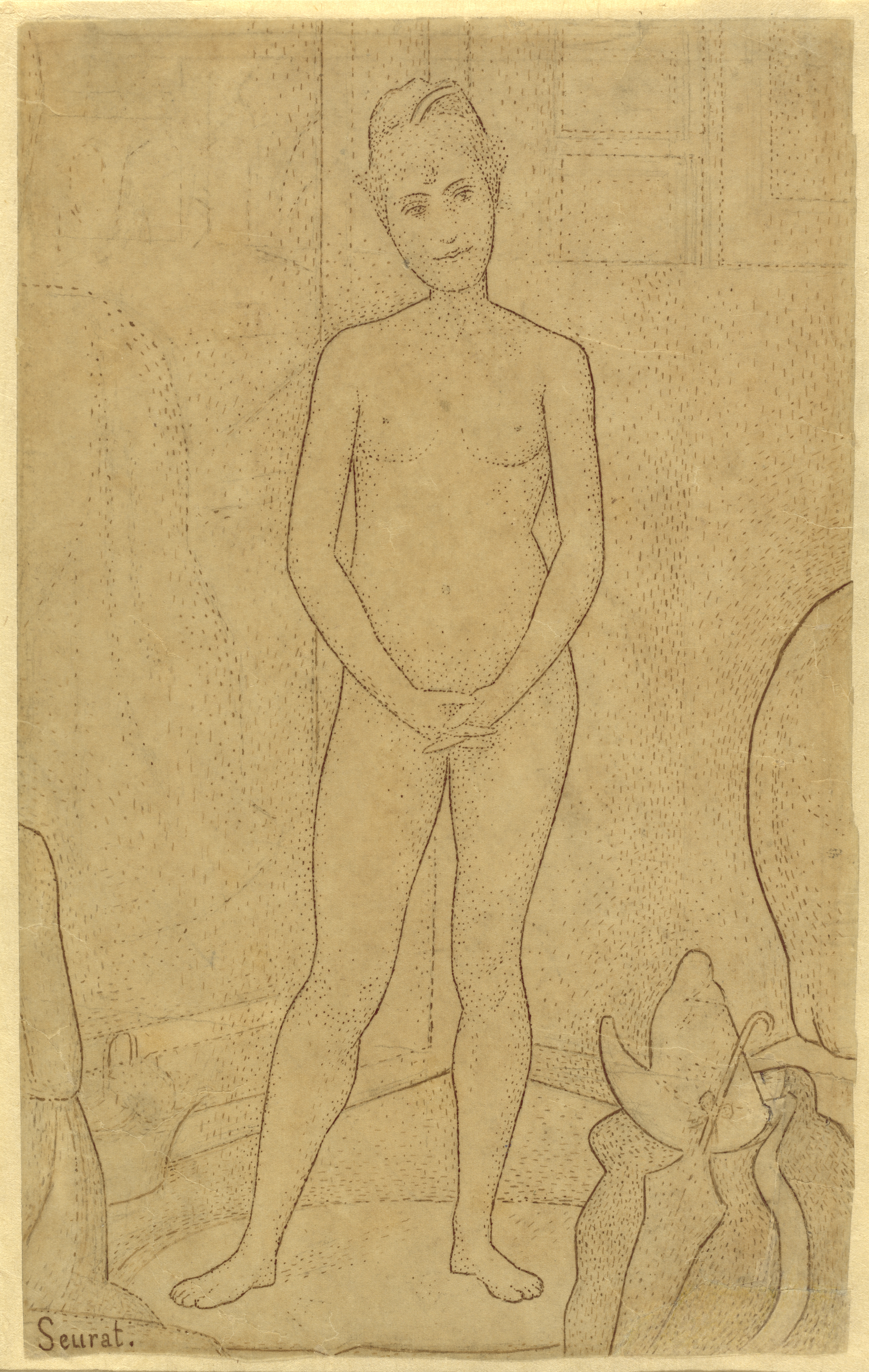
Study after "The Models", 1888

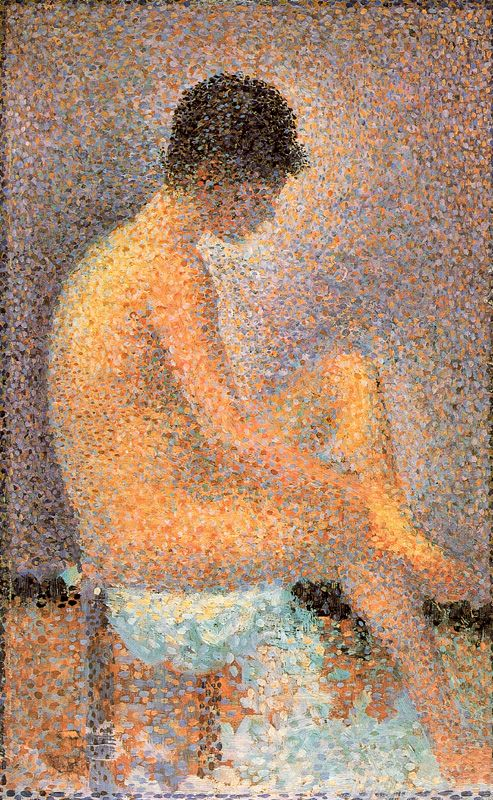
Poseuse de profil
(study)

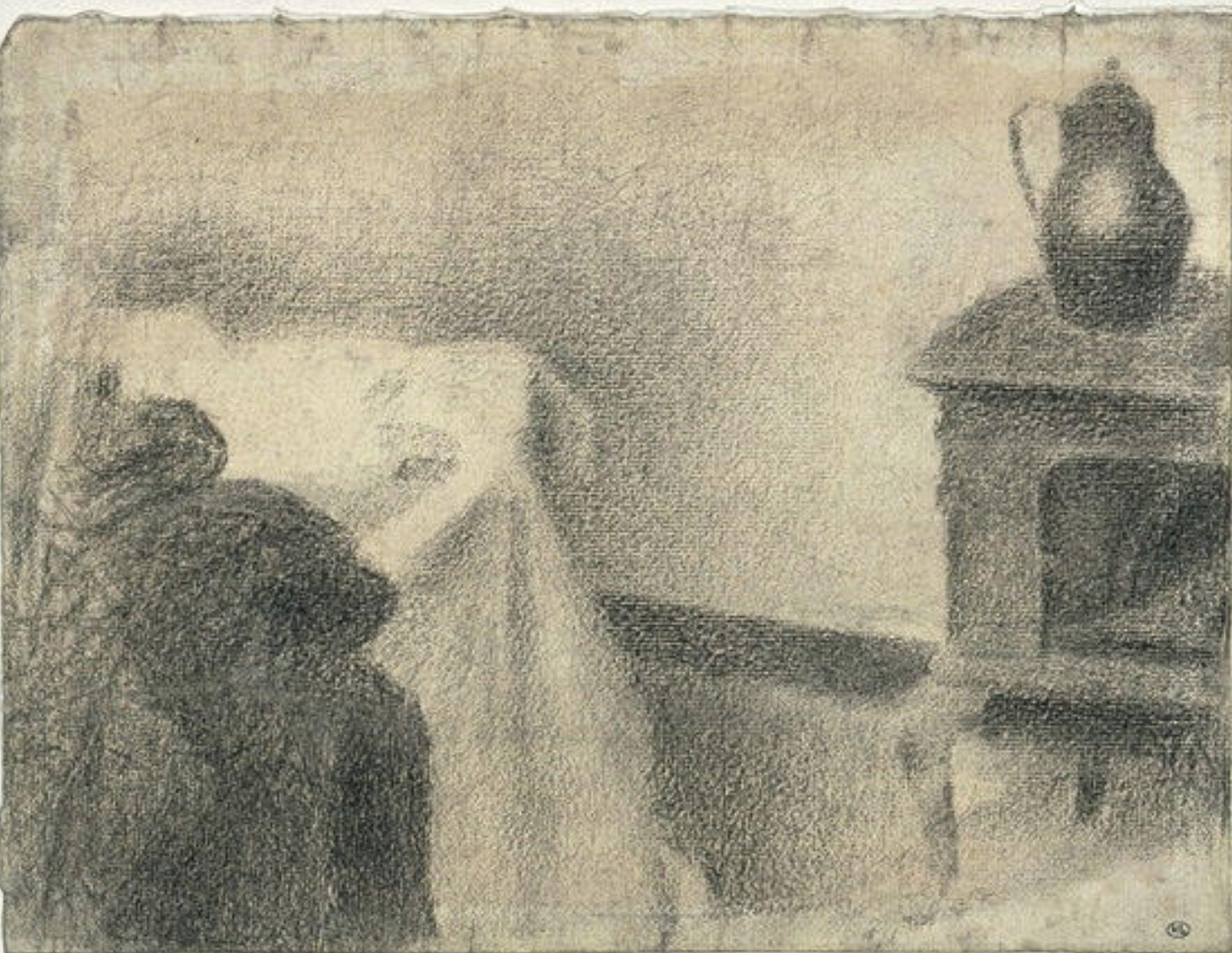
Part of the studio (study)

== See also ==
- List of paintings by Georges Seurat
