= Bathers at Asnières =

Painting by Georges Seurat

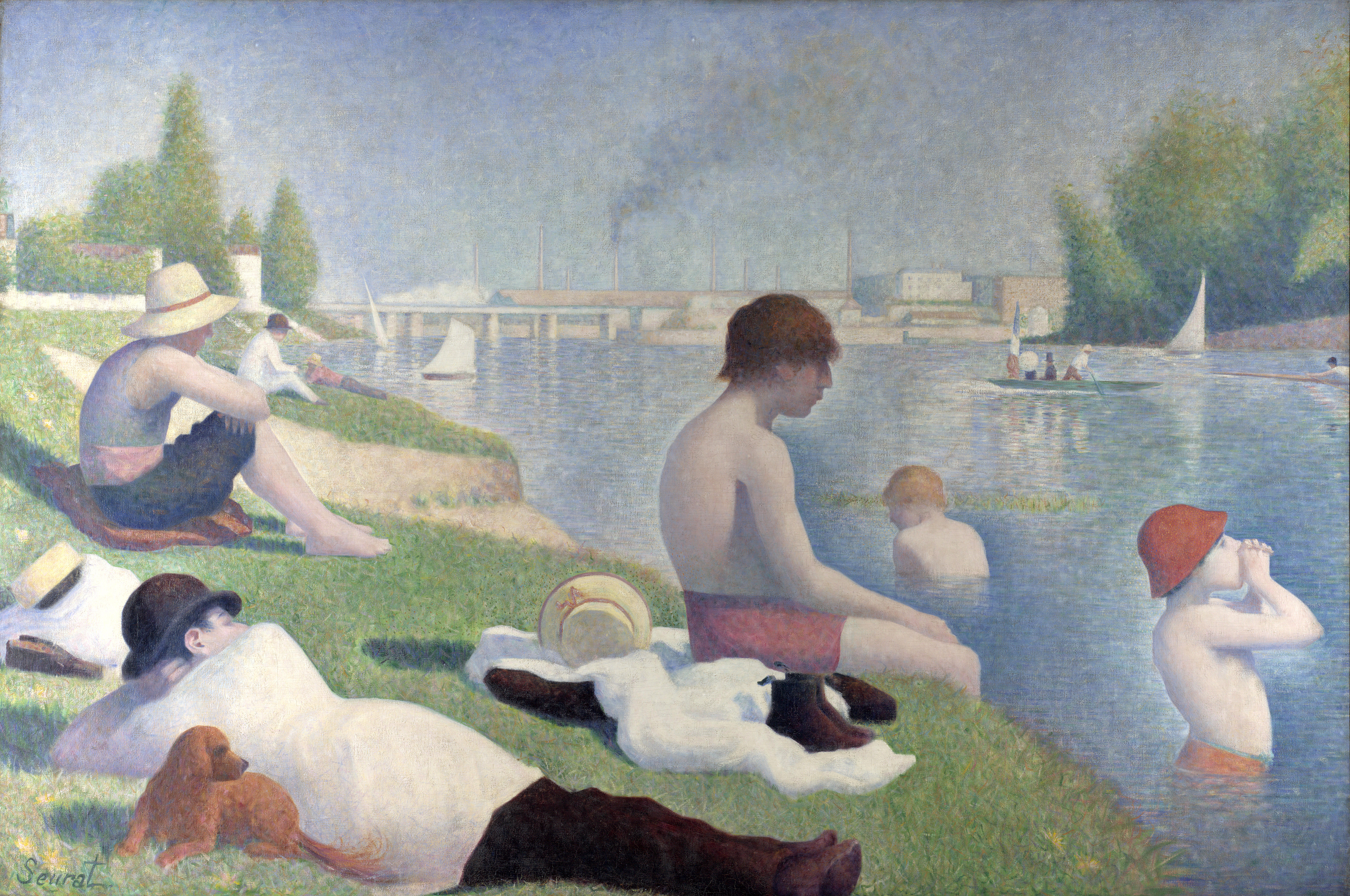
- Artist: Georges Seurat
- Year: 1884
- Medium: Oil on canvas
- Movement: Neo-Impressionism
- Dimensions: 201 cm × 301 cm (79 in × 118 in)
- Location: National Gallery, London

Bathers at Asnières (French: Une Baignade, Asnières) is an 1884 oil on canvas painting by the French artist Georges Seurat, the first of his two masterpieces on the monumental scale. The canvas is of a suburban, placid Parisian riverside scene. Isolated figures, with their clothes piled sculpturally on the riverbank, together with trees, austere boundary walls and buildings, and the River Seine are presented in a formal layout. A combination of complex brushstroke techniques and a meticulous application of contemporary color theory bring to the composition a sense of gentle vibrancy and timelessness.

Seurat completed the painting of Bathers at Asnières in 1884, at 24 years old. He applied to the jury of the Salon of the same year to have the work exhibited there, only to be rejected. The Bathers continued to puzzle many of Seurat’s contemporaries, and the picture would only be widely acclaimed many years after the artist's death at age 31. An appreciation of the piece's merits grew during the twentieth century; today it hangs in the National Gallery, London, where it is considered a highlight of the gallery’s collection of paintings.

== Location ==
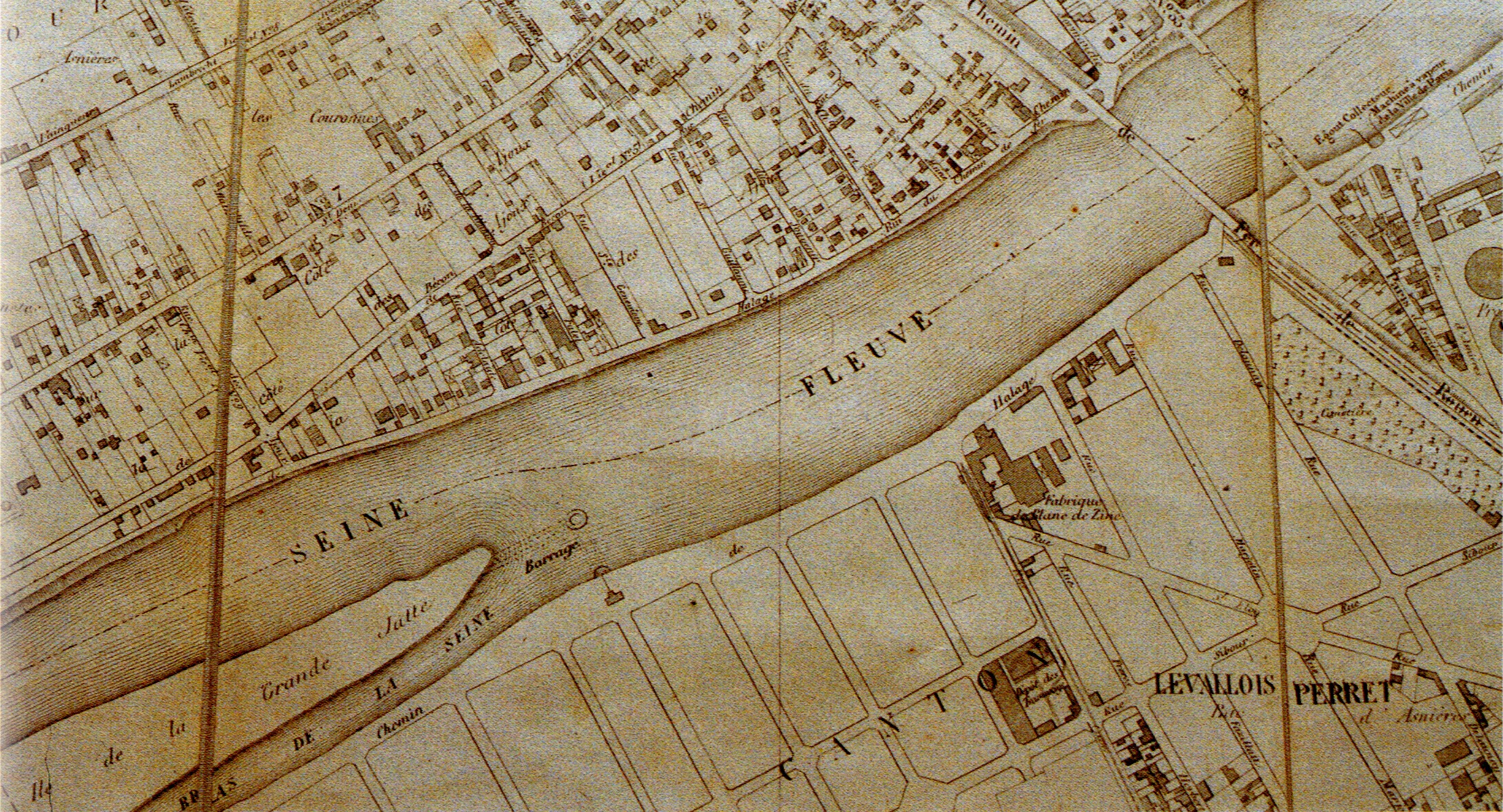
A possible site of the sandy gully is left of the page-fold. The bridges of Asnières are at the right.

The spot depicted is just short of four miles from the centre of Paris. In fact, the figures on the river-bank are not in the commune of Asnières, but in Courbevoie, the commune bordering Asnières to the west. The bathers are in the River Seine. The slope forming most of the left hand side of the painting was known as the Côte des Ajoux, near the end of the rue des Ajoux, on the north bank of the river. Opposite is the island of la Grande Jatte, the east tip of which is shown as the slope and the trees to the right, and which Seurat has pictorially extended beyond its actual length. The Asnières railway bridge and the industrial buildings of Clichy are in the background. Locations such as this one were sometimes shown on French nineteenth century maps as Baignade (or ‘bathing area’).

Many artists painted canvases from this stretch of the Seine during the 1880s. As well as the Bathers, some of Seurat’s better known works to come from the vicinity include his The Seine at Courbevoie, A Sunday Afternoon on the Island of La Grande Jatte, and The Bridge at Courbevoie.

== Aesthetic ==
Seurat used a variety of means to suggest the baking heat of a summer’s day at the riverside. A hot haze softens the edges of the trees in the middle-distance and washes out colour from the bridges and factories in the background—the blue of the sky at the horizon is paled almost to whiteness. A shimmering appearance at the surface of Bathers at Asnières subtly reinforces this saturating heat and sunlight. Writing about these effects, the art historian Roger Fry reported his view that “no one could render this enveloping with a more exquisitely tremulous sensibility, a more penetrating observation or more unfailing consistency, than Seurat”.

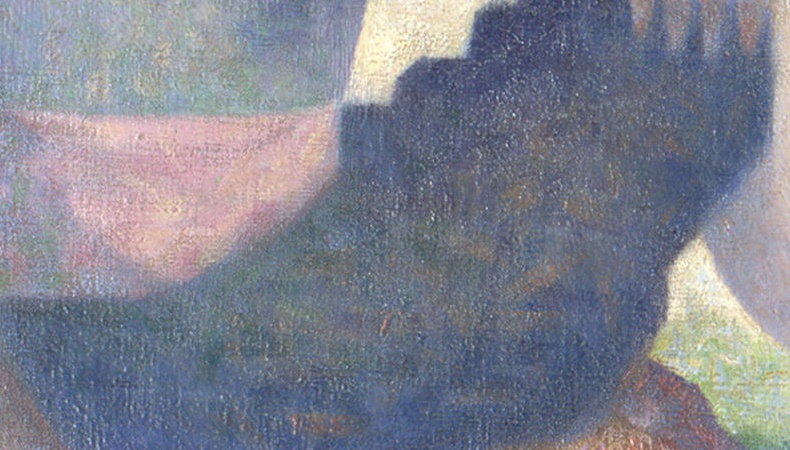
Man seated centre-left

The isolated figures are given statuesque but largely unmodeled treatment, and their skin and their clothes are clean, with a waxy finish. They appear unselfconscious, at ease in their environment, and—with the possible exception of the boy to the bottom right—are locked in a pensive and solitary reverie. Horizontal and vertical lines at the middle and far distance contrast with arched backs and the relaxed postures of the figures toward the front. These postures, angles of heads, directions of gaze, and positions of limbs are repeated among the figures, giving the group a rhythmic unity. Distinctively coloured forms in close proximity, such as the grouping of horse-chestnut colours of the clothes on the bank, and the grouping of oranges of the boys in the water, add to the stability of the work—an effect reinforced in the cluster of shadows to the left on the bank, and the un-verisimilar play of light around the bathing figures.

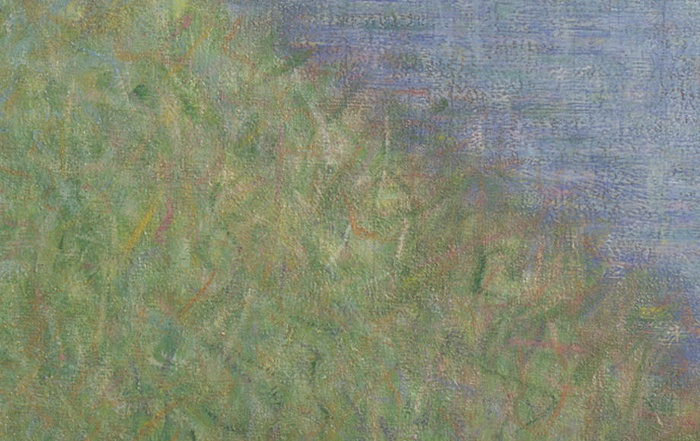
Balayé and fine horizontal strokes

Seurat described one of the brush-stroke techniques he developed on this canvas as the balayé technique, wherein a flat brush is used to apply matte colours using strokes in a criss-crossing formation. These strokes become smaller as they approach the horizon. The balayé technique is not rolled out in a consistent manner across the painting, but is adapted where Seurat thought it appropriate. The foreground—for example—consists of a balayé network of strokes atop a more solid layer of underpaint, suggesting the flickering play of sunlight over the blades of grass. This chunky, cross-hatched brushstroke pattern is in contrast with the nearly horizontal, much thinner strokes that are used to depict the water, and is in even greater contrast with the smoothly rendered skin of the figures.

== Seurat’s suburb ==
At the time of this painting, urban development in Paris was proceeding at a very rapid pace. The population of Paris had doubled from one million in 1850 to two million in 1877, and the population of Asnières had almost doubled in just ten years to reach 14,778 in 1886. The reality of the often unpleasant or dangerous conditions in which industrial workers laboured had already been fully taken on by painters, such as in—for instance—Monet’s painting of 1875, Men unloading coal, which in fact shows the bridges at Asnières as they were almost a decade before Seurat painted them.

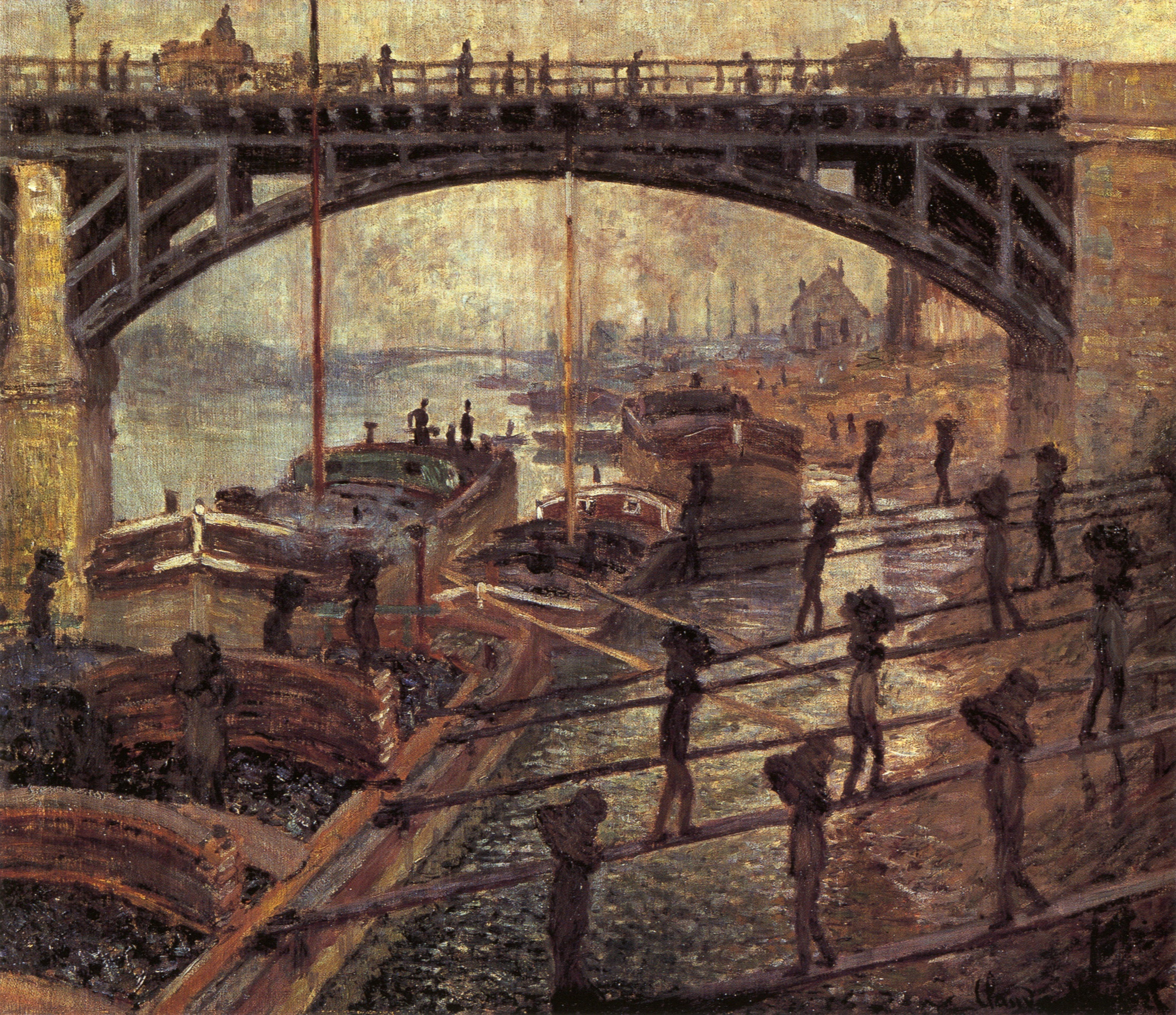
Monet, Men Unloading Coal, c.1875

Seurat however, elected not to make the real or imagined plight of the suburban workers his concern, instead portraying the labouring class and petit-bourgeoisie of Asnières and Courbevoie with dignity, and in a scene of lazy leisure. It was in the late nineteenth century a break with practice to use painting on this scale in this way, but Bathers at Asnières carries this unusual message with no note of incivility or incongruity.

Not only did Seurat decline to make absolutely clear the social status of the major figures in Bathers, but neither did he show them performing a public role of any kind. Their faces are for the most part shown in profile, and not one of them faces in the direction of the viewer. The anonymity and ambiguity with which these figures are painted was never again to feature so prominently in any major painting from Seurat.

The industrial infrastructure of bridges and factories to the rear is a notable feature of the composition. In spite of the unglamorous function and appearance of these recent additions to suburban Paris, they are painted as subtly variegated and somewhat classicised masses—veiled by the heat haze, and surrounded by trees at each side. Their appearance is punctuated by sails of sailing-boats and the strikingly coloured head of the central figure. These factories and trains were noisy and smelly, but Seurat does not permit this to dominate the painting; for all that the chimneys belch, they seem powerless to disrupt the settled scene.

== Preparatory works and influences ==
In 1878 and 1879—only a few years prior to painting the Bathers—Seurat had been a student at the École des Beaux-Arts. The École instructed its students that before work began on any large scale painting, there must first be extensive efforts with preparatory paintings and drawings. It seems possible that Seurat completed his first small oil study in this preparatory phase for the painting of the Bathers as early as 1882.

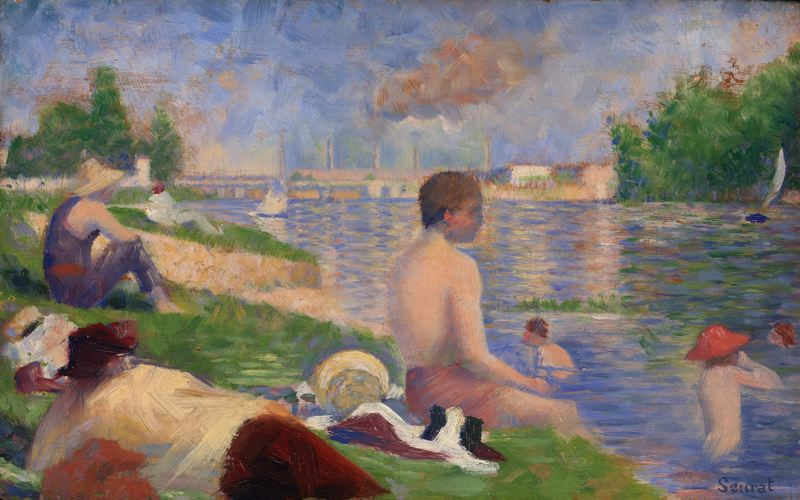
Final study, 1883, now in the Art Institute of Chicago

César de Hauke’s catalogue raisonné of the works of Seurat lists fourteen works as oil studies for the Bathers, most if not all of which were almost certainly painted outdoors, and in which the composition of the final piece may be seen gradually taking shape. The last of these studies—presently housed at the Art Institute of Chicago—was painted in 1883 and is very close to the final work, except most obviously in respect of its size; it is just 25 cm long and 16 cm high. Seurat was fond of these small studies, calling them his croquetons (a nonce word best translated as ‘sketchettes’), and hanging them on the walls of his studio.

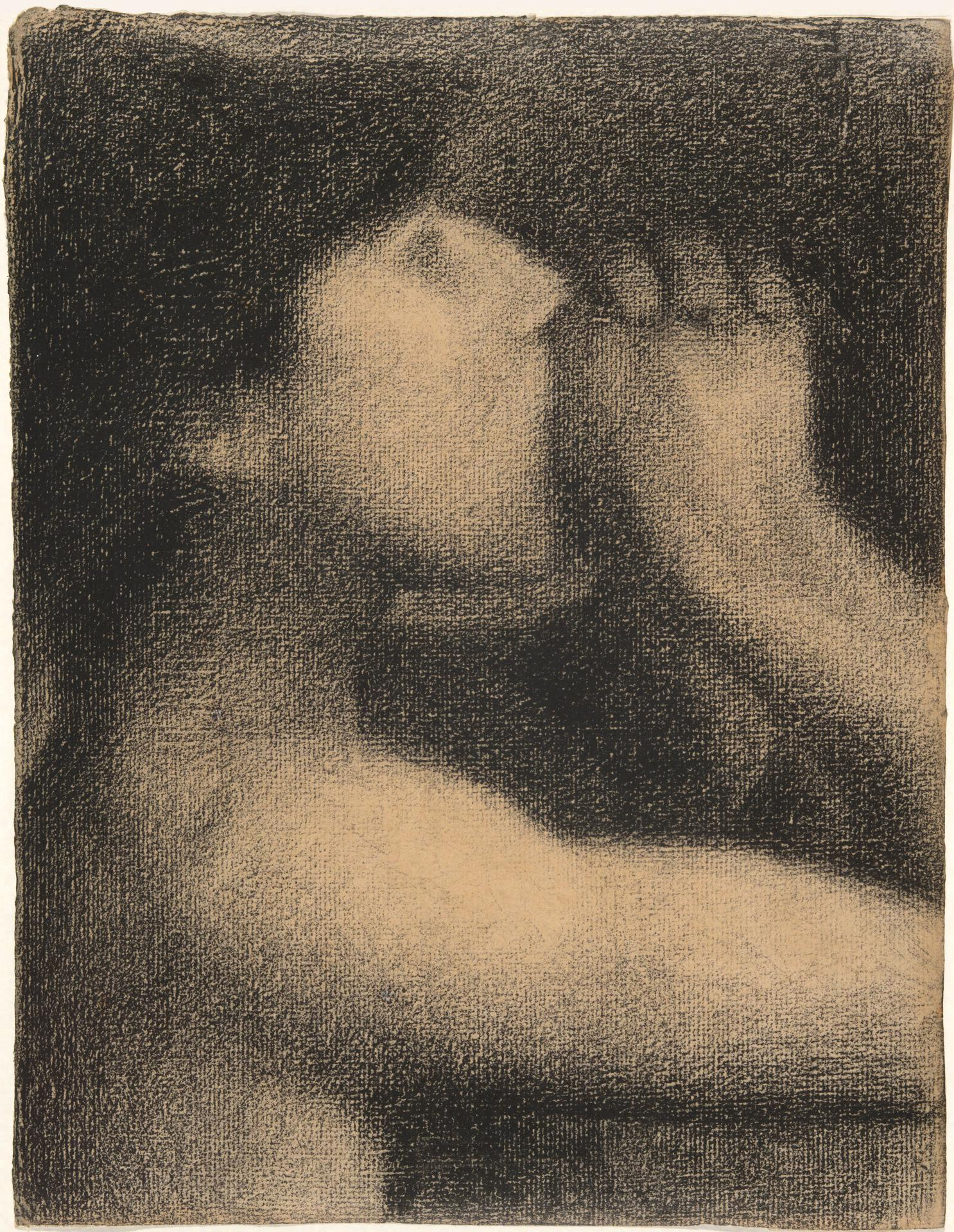
Conté crayon study of boy to the far right

Whereas for the most part Seurat used these oil studies to work through his compositional problems, nine extant drawings in conté crayon show him focusing individually on each of the five main figures in the painting. The drawings show Seurat working out ways of deploying light and shade for the purpose of implying space and plasticity. Many of the details the painter worked on in these monochrome drawings were to find their final realisation when translated into the colours of the finished oil painting.

These arduous methods of preparation were in keeping with the general values espoused at the École. But one professor from that institution was to have a more particular and wide ranging impact on Seurat’s imagination, which bore directly discernable effects in the Bathers. Charles Blanc had been a professor and director at the École and had arranged for copies of Quattrocento fresco paintings from Arezzo to be displayed in the École chapel. The huge, stately and dignified figures in these frescos, and the regularity of their spacing has obvious echoes in the Bathers. Among these fresco painters was Piero della Francesca, whose Resurrection depicts a sleeping guard at the bottom-left sharing a number of features with the seated man in Bathers at Asnières. The curvature of slumping back and bent legs is clearly matched in both figures, and indeed the posture also appears in the Young Male Nude Seated beside the Sea of Jean-Hippolyte Flandrin, a painting with which any student at the École would have been familiar. The sculpted contours of Piero’s soldier’s cape find an echo in the rugged contours of the trousers in Seurat’s painting, and the flick at the back of the guard’s hat becomes a rhythmic motif showing up with hats, hair and bootstraps alike in Bathers.

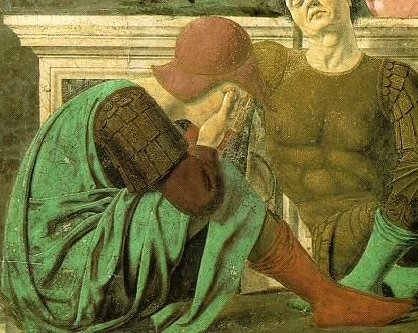
Piero della Francesca, Resurrection, c.1460

Further, Blanc had written a book in 1867, which Seurat read the year he began his studies at the École, and which was to strongly influence him during his formative years—the Grammaire des arts du dessin. Near the beginning of this book, Blanc had claimed that Nicolas Poussin’s The Finding of Moses was an exemplary case of how art should idealise nature, concluding his passage, "This is how a scene from everyday life suddenly becomes raised to the dignity of a history painting." This remark seems pertinent to the Bathers, which certainly shares a number of compositional elements with Poussin’s masterpiece of 1638. Both works show to the right a lowered male figure, and to the left a reclining male figure painted from behind. The horizon in both paintings is punctured just off-centre with a head, and in both paintings the river is spanned with a distant bridge, with block-like buildings on the left bank and trees on the other. And both pictures have a flat-bottomed boat at the centre-right.

The influence of Seurat’s French contemporary Pierre Puvis de Chavannes—and in particular of his Doux Pays shown at the Salon of 1882—is also evident in the Bathers. Both paintings are on the monumental scale—that of Puvis’ being over four metres long—and both works have life-size figures. The theme of the architectonic group of figures to the left in Doux Pays is echoed by Seurat; where Puvis shows a half-pedimental group in one plane, Seurat uses recession, and suggests association by means of repetition. The two paintings also share the technique of dividing their large canvases into areas of predominant colours—of blue and gold in Doux Pays, to rather cool effect, and of blue and green in the Bathers with a warmer result. In both paintings a prominent figure breaks into the horizon just off-centre, a curved sail appears in almost the same spot to the right, and triangular poses are observed, as are boys in varying degrees of rest. William I. Homer, in addressing the light hues and matte surface of the Bathers, remarked that its, “pale and somewhat chalky tonality... recalls the earlier decorations of [Puvis].”

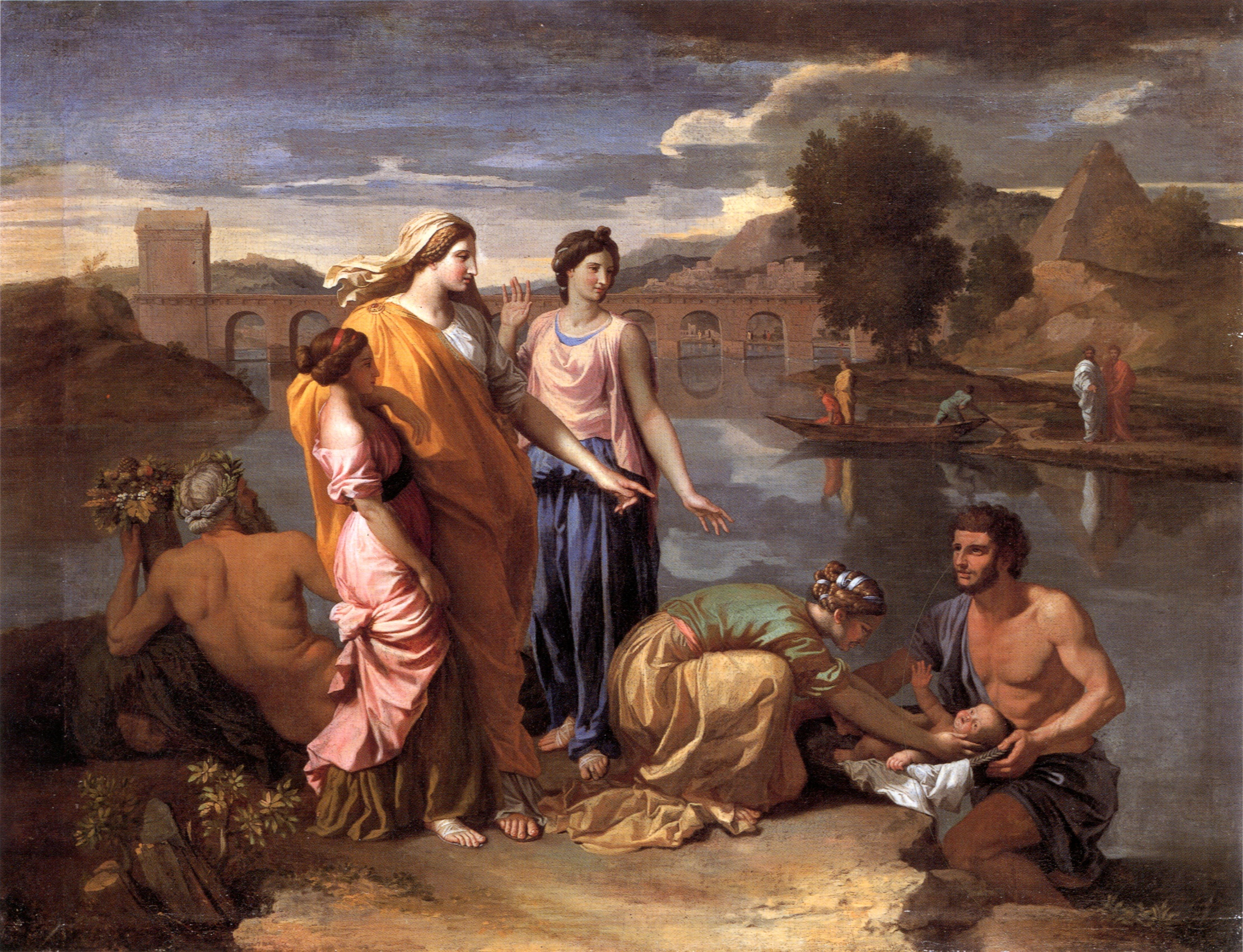
Poussin, The Finding of Moses, 1638

Although a receptive and conscientious student at the revered École, Seurat had been open to ideas from some more esoteric sources too. In 1879, with his friend, fellow École student and future portrait-subject Edmond Aman-Jean, Seurat attended the fourth exhibition of paintings from the then very disliked Impressionist painters, where they received an “unexpected and profound shock”. Although Seurat had already seen modern aesthetic theories summarised in Blanc’s Grammaire, he sought out the original texts from the theoreticians themselves, such those of David Sutter, the chemist Michel Eugène Chevreul, and the physicist Ogden Rood, whose Modern Chromatics was written while Seurat was at the École, and which the artist read as soon as it was translated into French in 1881. Having immersed himself in these authors’ works, Seurat borrowed heavily from their modern theories about colours and the way humans perceive them. These influences allowed Seurat to emerge from the disciplines of the École to fashion his own distinctly modern method of using tone and colour.

One of the recurrent themes of these painstakingly detailed new theories was the idea that humans may not perceive colours in isolation but rather, that one colour may be seen to interfere with another colour neighbouring it. In this way, colour perception was explained as a complex, interpretive process, rather than a static and simple record of visual data. Seurat’s response to the theories in these writings is widely evident in the Bathers, most obviously in such areas as those of the torso and legs of the man seated centre-left on the persimmon-orange cushion, and of the central figure as his back contrasts with light blue water and his arm contrasts with water of a darker hue.

== Reception and history ==
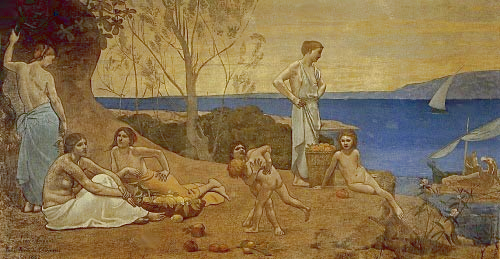
Puvis de Chavannes, Doux Pays, 1882

In 1882 Seurat rented a small studio in the rue Chabrol close to his family’s home. Bathers at Asnières was painted in this studio, on a canvas identical in size to that part of A Sunday Afternoon on the Island of La Grande Jatte that excludes the painted border. Following the rejection of the Bathers by the jury of the Salon of 1884, Seurat joined forces with some like-minded artists to become a founder members of the Groupe des Artistes Indépendants. This institution held its first exhibition—the Salon de Artistes Indépendants—between May 15th and July 1st, 1884 at a temporary building in the place du Carrousel, adjacent to the Louvre. Bathers at Asnières is listed in the exhibition catalog as painting number 261, and it was displayed along with works from a total of 402 artists. Despite the fact that Seurat was a founder member of the Groupe, his painting was displayed in the unglamorous location of the exhibition beer hall, and appears to have had no great impact on spectators at the exhibition. Later the same year, the Groupes des Artistes Indépendants went on became the Société des Artistes Indépendants, and the Bathers was also hung at the first exhibition of the newly renamed Société. In 1886 Paul Durand-Ruel took the picture, along with some three hundred other canvases, to the National Academy of Design in New York, where he held his exhibition of the “Works in Oil and Pastel by the Impressionists of Paris.”

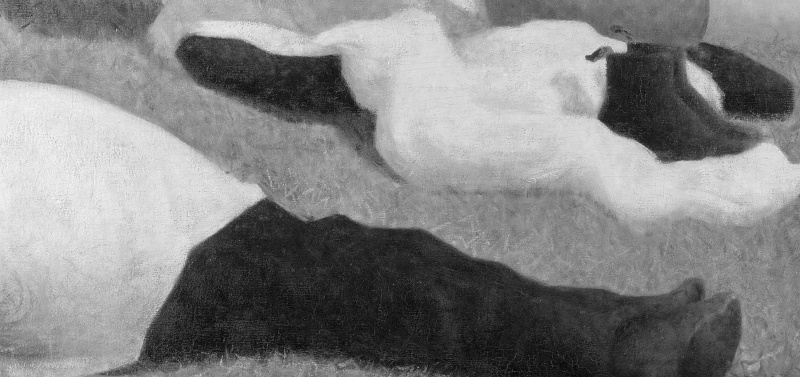
Modeling and contrast in the foreground

The painting received mixed reviews from critics and commentators on both sides of the Atlantic. The novelist and Biographer Paul Alexis commented equivocally, ‘This is a false Puvis de Chavannes. What funny male and female [sic] bathers! But it is painted with so much conviction that it appears almost touching and I don’t quite dare poke fun at it.’ In L’Intransigeant, Edmond Bazire, writing under the pseudonym ‘Edmond Jacques’, wrote, ‘behind and under some prismatic eccentricities Seurat conceals the most distinguished qualities of draughtsmanship, and envelops his bathing men, his ripples, his horizons in warm tones.’ Both Jules Claretie and Roger Marx also described the painting as being a noteworthy ‘Impressionist’ painting. The Art Amateur’s anonymous reviewer of the New York exhibition—who even explicitly likened Bathers at Asnières to Italian fresco painting—also called the picture a modern ‘Impressionist’ work. Paul Signac remarked that the Bathers was painted ‘...[I]n great flat strokes, brushed one over the other, fed by a palette composed, like Delacroix’s, of pure and earthy colours. By means of these ochres and browns the picture was deadened and appeared less brilliant than the works the impressionists painted with a palette limited to prismatic colours. But the understanding of the laws of contrast, the methodical separation of elements—light, shade, local colour, and the interaction of colours—as well as their proper balance and proportion gave this canvas its perfect harmony.’

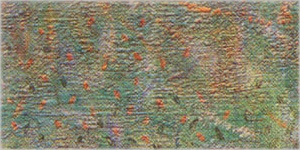
Pointillistic retouches applied around 1887

Less flatteringly, an anonymous reviewer of Durand-Ruel’s Impressionist Exhibition in New York City wrote in the newspaper The Sun that, “The great master, from his own point of view, must surely be Seurat whose monstrous picture of The Bathers consumes so large a part of the Gallery D. This is a picture conceived in a coarse, vulgar, and commonplace mind, the work of a man seeking distinction by the vulgar qualification and expedient of size. It is bad from every point of view, including his own.” This was by no means the only such uncomplimentary review in American and French newspapers. But with the passage of decades, the Bathers slowly emerged into critical respectability. The critic and friend of Seurat, Félix Fénéon waited many years before commenting, ‘Though I did not commit myself in writing, I then [in 1884] completely realised the importance of this painting.‘ For many years, Bathers at Asnières remained in the possession of Seurat’s family, and in 1900 the work was purchased by Felix Fénéon. In 1924 it was purchased for the British national collections and hung in the Tate Gallery. It was moved in 1961 to the National Gallery where it has remained since.

X-ray imaging of the Bathers has revealed that some components of the composition were altered as Seurat’s work on the canvas progressed, while other components were probably not in the painting at all, as he first painted it. The two reclining figures—one at the front of the image, the other with the straw hat toward the rear—are revealed by the X-ray image to have been among the later concerns for Seurat. The reclining man at the front has had the position of his legs moved to a position more horizontal than that in which they were when first painted. The reclining figure toward the rear is not visible in the X-ray image at all, showing he is a late addition. His posture reflects the altered position of the man in the foreground, raising the suggestion that he was painted in as a compositional response to the alteration made to the man at the front. The skiff and the ferry boat with the tricolor, and the pointillistically applied spots at various locations in the lower mid-section of the painting, are also absent in the X-ray image. A contentious theory suggests that these elements were added by Seurat as a means of making a connection between the Bathers and A Sunday Afternoon on the Island of La Grande Jatte. In spite of their remoteness in the middle distance, the motifs and the seated figures on the boat are present in the later painting, and the ferry boat indeed traverses the river between the Courbevoie river-bank and the île de la Grande Jatte itself. The late additions in Bathers bring for the first time a note of vitality to the serene picture in keeping with the more "sociable" climate of A Sunday Afternoon on the Island of La Grande Jatte.

== See also ==
- List of paintings by Georges Seurat
