= List of Chuck Close subjects =

Chuck Close was an American painter and photographer who primarily created massive-scale portraits. Close's portraits had simple titles, using only the subject's first name. Many of his subjects were friends who, like Close, were also artists, or dealers and collectors of art; others were simply friends or family members.

== Subjects ==
- Self-portrait, Chuck Close
- Laurie Anderson, performance artist, composer, musician
- Richard Artschwager, painter, illustrator and sculptor
- Susan Austad
- Lynda Benglis, sculptor
- Cecily Brown, painter
- Paul Cadmus, painter
- John Chamberlain, sculptor
- Francesco Clemente, painter
- Bill Clinton, politician, 42nd President of the United States
- Hillary Clinton, politician and diplomat
- Georgia Close (artist's daughter)
- Leslie Close (artist's wife)
- Maggie Close (artist's daughter)
- Robert Cottingham, photorealist painter
- Renee Cox, artist
- Gregory Crewdson, photographer
- Merce Cunningham, choreographer, dancer
- Willem Dafoe, actor
- Carroll Dunham
- Charles Durning, actor
- Robert Elson (artist's wife's junior high school friend)
- Inka Essenhigh, painter
- Bob Feldman
- Linda Rosenkrantz Finch
- Eric Fischl, painter, sculptor, printmaker
- Janet Fish, painter
- Renée Fleming, opera singer
- Kent Floeter
- Ellen Gallagher, artist
- Philip Glass, composer
- Arne Glimcher, art dealer, film producer
- Al Gore, politician
- April Gornik, painter
- Nancy Graves, sculptor, painter
- Kathy Halbreich, curator
- Lyle Ashton Harris, artist
- Keith Hollingworth
- Bob Holman, poet
- Robert Israel
- Frank James
- Jasper Johns
- Ray Johnson
- Bill T. Jones
- Alex Katz
- Klaus Kertress
- Fanny Leifer
- Roy Lichtenstein
- Agnes Martin
- Kate Moss
- Elizabeth Murray
- Jud Nelson
- Elizabeth Peyton
- Judy Pfaff
- Brad Pitt
- Christopher Plummer
- Robert Rauschenberg
- Dorothea Rockburne
- Nat Rose
- Stanley Rosen
- John Roy
- Lucas Samaras, artist, Lucas I, 1986–1987
- Richard Serra
- Andres Serrano
- Joel Shapiro
- Cindy Sherman
- James Siena
- Carly Simon
- Paul Simon, musician, see Stranger to Stranger album cover
- Lorna Simpson
- Kiki Smith
- James Turrell
- William Wegman
- Robert Wilson
- Terry Winters
- Lisa Yuskavage
- Joe Zucker
- Kara Walker, artist
