= Sailboats and Estuary =

Théo van Rysselberghe

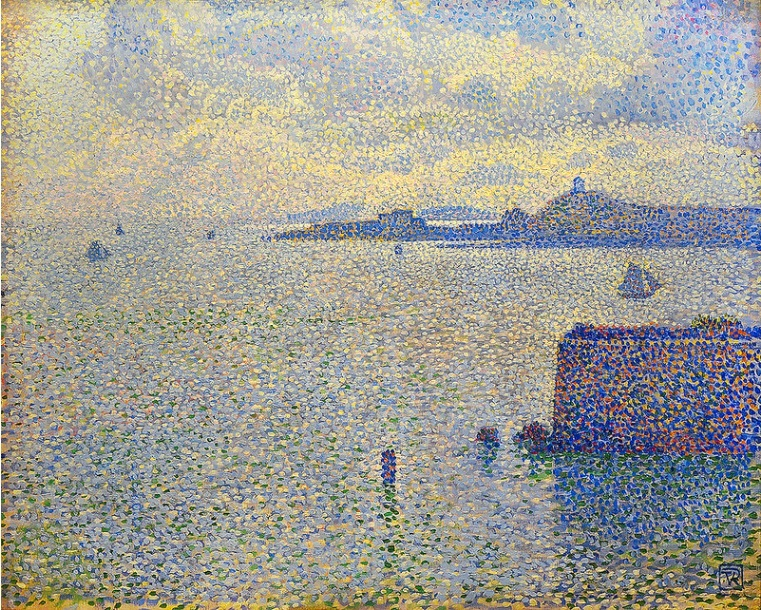
- Artist: Théo van Rysselberghe
- Year: ca. 1887
- Catalogue: RF 1982 16
- Medium: Oil on canvas
- Dimensions: 50.2 cm × 61 cm (19 7/6 in × 24 in)
- Location: Musée d'Orsay; Paris

Sailboats and Estuary (also The Entrance to the Port of Roscoff, French: L'entrée du port de Roscoff) is an oil-on-canvas painting by Belgian artist Théo van Rysselberghe. Painted around 1887, it shows a coastal landscape elaborated in a Pointillist technique. Van Rysselberghe probably adopted the Pointillist manner after befriending Paul Signac; however, the use of color in Sailboats and Esuary is nonetheless far more realistic than in paintings by Signac and other Neo-Impressionists, and reveals a tendency towards naturalism. The artwork has been in the collection of the Musée d'Orsay in Paris since 1982, on loan from the Louvre.

== Context ==
Van Rysselberghe was one of the founders of the Brussels progressive association Les XX, and played a leading role in the communication between Belgian and French artists. He regularly traveled to Paris to meet fellow painters and to visit exhibitions.

When, in 1886, during the last major Impressionist exhibition Georges Seurat presented what would become the leading example of pointillist technique, namely A Sunday Afternoon on the Island of La Grande Jatte, Van Rysselberghe initially voiced reservations about it in an exchange of letters with his friend Emile Verhaeren.

In 1887, however, he was the one who arranged for the work to be shown in an exhibition of Les XX, along with six coastal landscapes that Seurat created in Grandcamp and Honfleur. One year later, Van Rysselberghe organized an exhibition in Brussels with Neo-Impressionist painters such as Paul Signac, Henri-Edmond Cross and Albert Dubois-Pillet. In the meantime he had also adopted the pointillist method himself, both in his portraits and landscapes. One of the earliest examples is the canvas he probably painted around 1887, or 1889, that is Sailboats and Estuary.

== Painting ==
In the late 1880s, Van Rysselberghe painted a number of pointillist works on the coasts of Normandy and Brittany, which seem to have been inspired by the coastal views of Grandcamp and Honfleur realized by Seurat, whose waterscapes often draw the viewer in with a close-up view of land or a pier at the side of the canvas, and then give way to an expanse of ocean and sky separated by a thin wedge of land. The work is unsigned and was in a private collection for a long time until 1982.

Sailboats and Estuary is typical of both the theme and the neo-impressionist style that Van Rysselberghe had learned directly from the movement's leading artists: he started entirely from the theory of color as defined by Seurat, more specifically, his "doctrine of simultaneous contrasts", which he had studied extensively. He meticulously juxtaposes unmixed dark blue, crimson, yellow, green and white brushstrokes against each other in arithmetically determined proportions, as in a kind of mosaic. Ultimately this leads to an extremely balanced, tightly styled composition, with an almost classical rigor. In a synthetic way he allows the fragmented color keys to flow into a monochrome overall image, where the separate color keys blocks give an almost glittering effect. With this he achieves the maximum effect of the special light effect propagated by Seurat in his color theory, also referred to as luminism.

A reviewer of the Parisian art magazine La Plume wrote of the painting on April 1, 1898, "it shows in all its facets the full luminous beauty that the new pointillist school can offer."

== Gallery ==
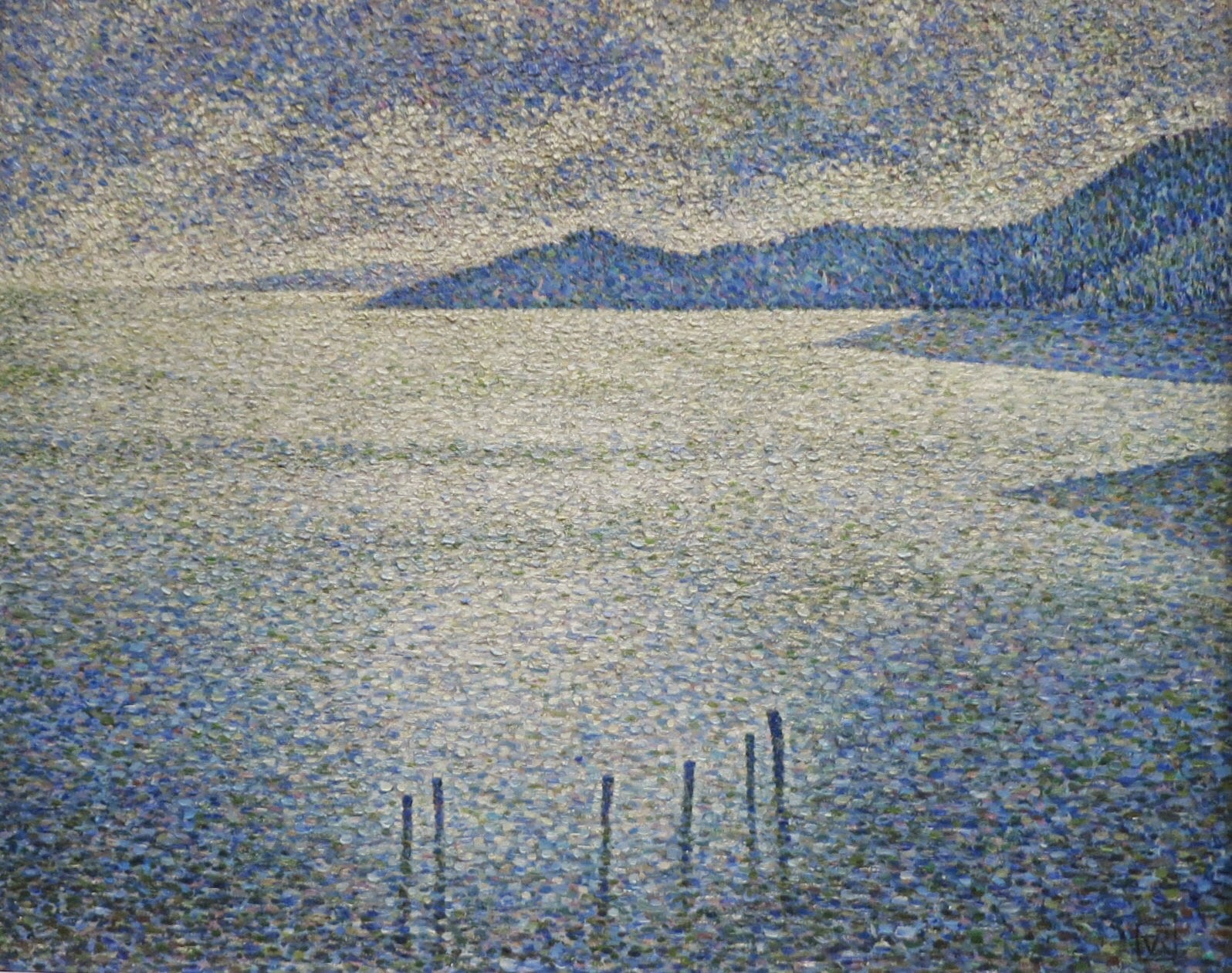
Coastal scene, same period

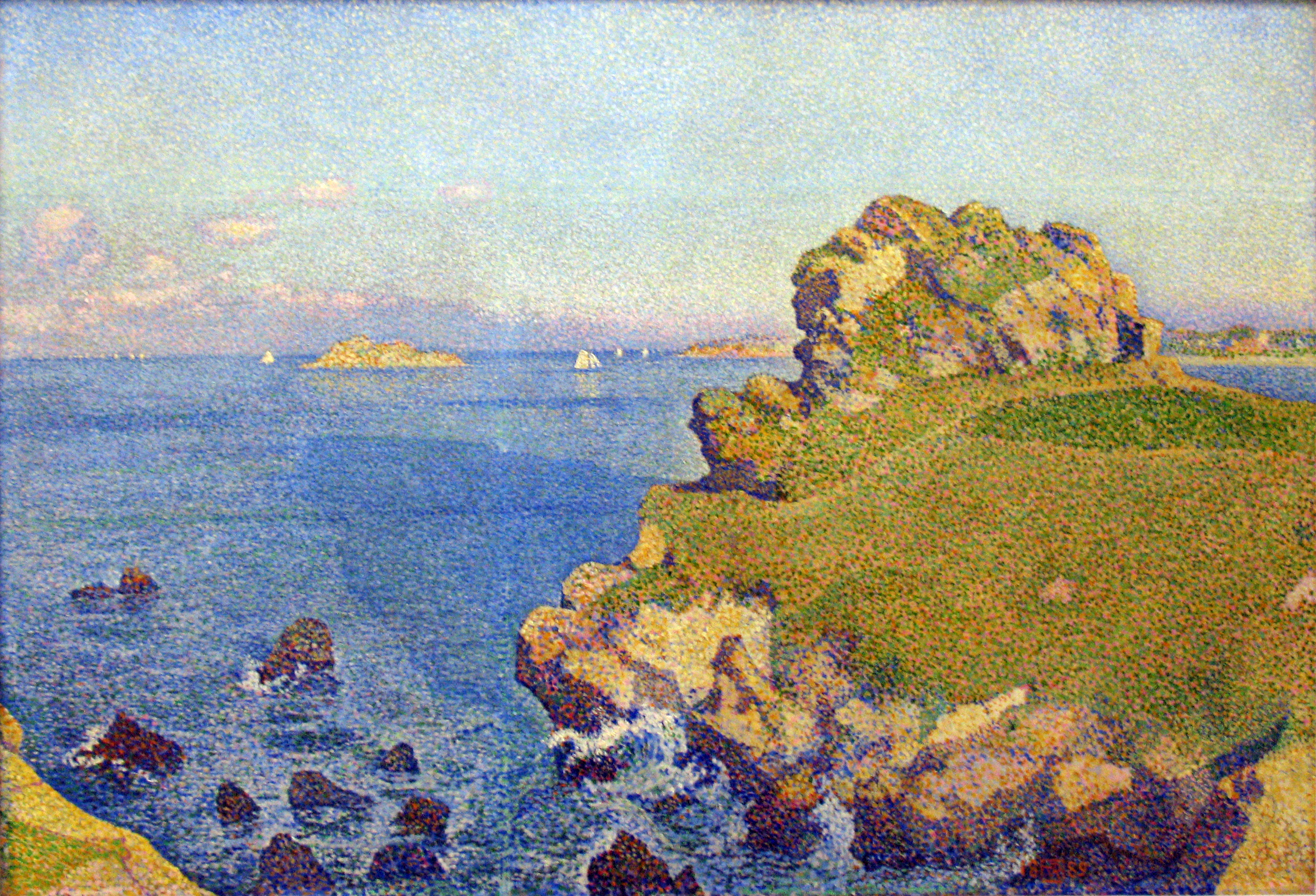
Rock at Perkiridy in Brittany, 1889

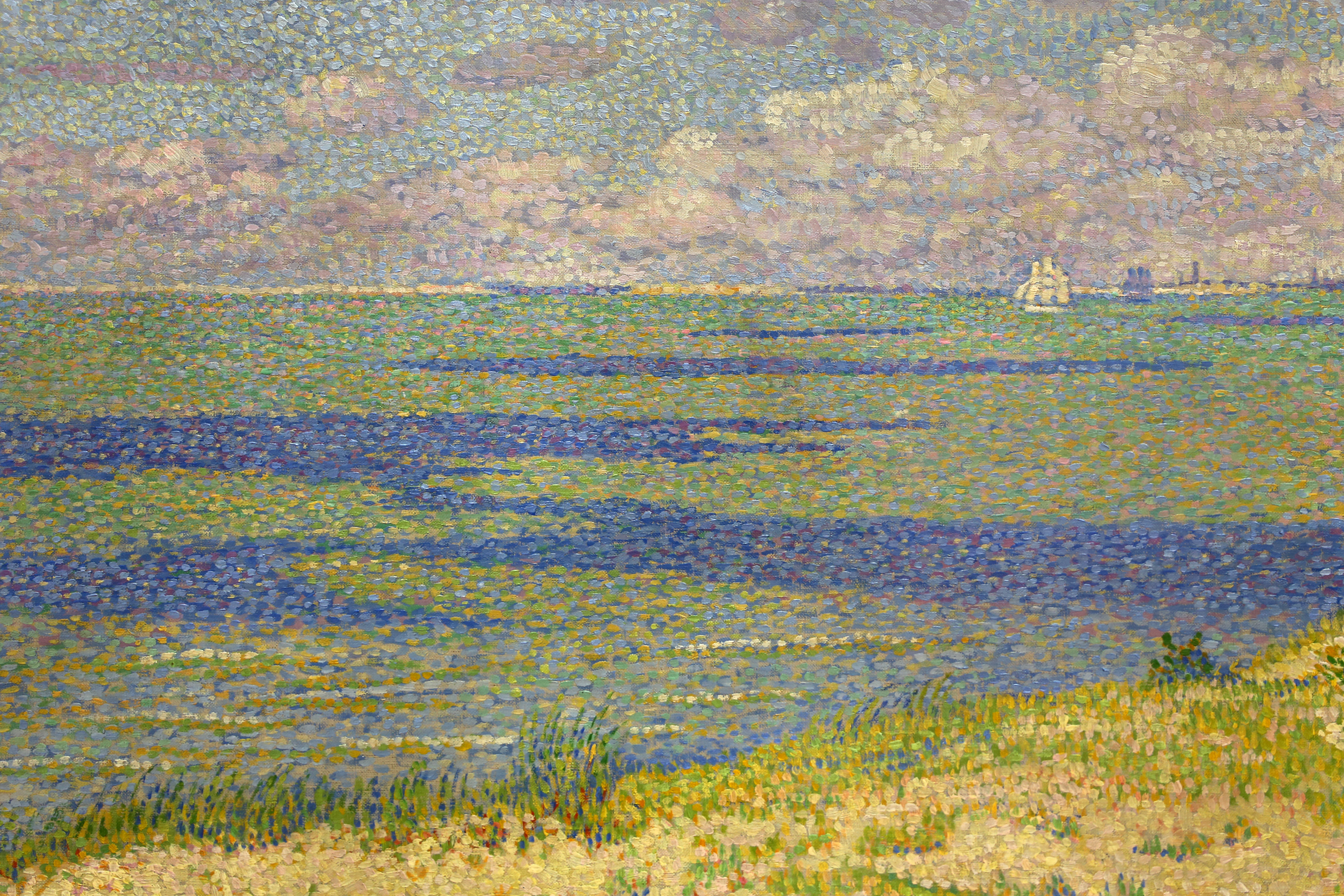
Dunes at Cadzand, 1893

== Sources ==
- Geneviéve Lacombe e.a.: Musée d'Orsay: impressionist and post-impressionist paintings, Thames and Hudson, Londen, 1995, blz. 178–179. ISBN 978-90-5356-834-7
