= Gale D. Jones =

American watercolor artist

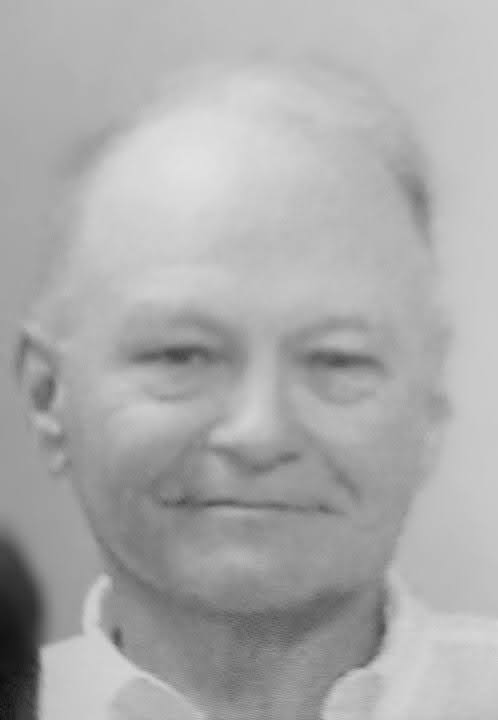
Gale D. Jones

Gale Dean Jones (21 August 1956 – 18 January 2023) was an American artist best known for his woven watercolor technique. Woven watercolor technique involved creating two separate watercolor paintings in differing colors of the same subject, cutting each into strips, and weaving them into a composite work. Jones completed at least two woven watercolor works during a period of legal blindness caused by diabetic retinopathy from March 1981 through the summer of 1982. One of his woven watercolor works, "The Survivor", was featured in a national traveling exhibit of visually impaired artists sponsored by the National Exhibits by Blind Artists. Jones was the subject of a professional profile in the June 1984 issue of "American Artist" magazine which detailed his woven watercolor methods and sight impairment.

== Early life and education ==
Born in Tilden, Nebraska, Jones grew up in the nearby town of Neligh. He was diagnosed with diabetes at age nine. He graduated from Neligh-Oakdale High School in Neligh, NE in 1974. He furthered his education at Northeast Community College in Norfolk, Nebraska, where he earned an associate arts degree in 1976. Jones attended Kearney State College (KSC) in Kearney, Nebraska from 1976 to 1979, earning a Bachelor of Arts Degree in Art Education and a Bachelor of Fine Arts with a watercolor specialization. Jones said that he returned to KSC for a third year as a graduate student to paint independently from the influence of his professor's' critiques and grades.

== Adult life and artistic career ==
Jones moved to Missouri after completing his collegiate work in Kearney. He made a living sketching $2.00 caricatures for tourists near Bagnall Dam on the Lake of the Ozarks. Later, he became a resident artist at the 7 Seas Port of Fine Art Gallery nearby. During this time, he met fellow artist Carol Tietmeyer, whom he was married from 1983 to 1989. Initially, Jones lived in a motel owned by members of the Osage tribe. He occasionally paid rent by trading his drawings of the motel owner’s ancestors and prominent Native American figures.

In the mid-1980s, Jones moved to Norfolk, Nebraska where he opened Ravenwood Fine Arts Gallery in downtown Norfolk which he owned and operated for over 30 years until selling the business in 2019.

Jones was invited to exhibit his woven watercolor work, entitled "Starring Role," at the Knickerbocker Artists 34th Annual Open Exhibition. The Exhibition was held at the Salmagundi Galleries on Fifth Avenue in New York City, NY. Following the exhibit, in 1985 Jones was notified that he had been elected a signature member. He often included "KA" in his artist signature after that point.

Jones painted and sketched many major works and studies featuring the sandhill crane. He gained an appreciation for the bird while in college as their annual spring migration brought them to the Platte River Valley in Nebraska a few miles south of Kearney, NE. He developed a great affinity for their majestic appearance, sounds of the flock, and impressive courtship displays. Cranes were the primary subject as he developed his “grid technique.” One of his earlier woven watercolor works, “Doing the Two Step,” was awarded best of show at the 1981 Missouri State Fair. “Doing the Two Step”, features sandhill cranes in the Platte River Valley performing a mating “dance” ritual.

In 2001 He received a kidney and pancreas transplant at Clarkson Hospital / University of Nebraska Medical Center (UNMC) in Omaha, NE.

Jones died on 18 January 2023 at UNMC following a heart procedure. His burial site is in the Royal, NE cemetery.

== Legal blindness and vision restoration ==
Jones began to experience blurred vision in 1980 due to diabetic retinopathy, which causes blood vessels behind the retinas to bleed. During this general timeframe, he began to prepare himself for a potential life of blindness. In interviews, Jones said he received counseling from the Missouri Bureau for the Blind and had begun to learn Braille. He also noted he was mentally preparing to move into alternative art mediums, such as sculpting, ceramics, or writing, if his vision didn't improve.

Jones was legally blind from March 1981 until the summer of 1982. During that period, with the aid of magnification tools, he completed at least two Woven Watercolors, “The Survivor” & “One Brief Moment...Then Gone” (woven watercolor). “The Survivor” features a Bison separated from its herd, symbolizing his battle with health challenges and feelings of isolation. “One Brief Moment...Then Gone” (featured in the American Artist profile) shows a northern bobwhite quail taking flight. "The Survivor" painting was one of 81 pieces selected for the 1983 National Exhibit by Blind Artists which was displayed at the Brooklyn Museum of Fine Art in New York City, NY, Wadsworth Atheneum in Hartford, CT, and Moore College of Art in Paoli, PA.

He underwent multiple surgeries to stabilize his vision and remove cataracts in both eyes. Jones’s legal blindness ended around June 1982 after cataract surgery. Though he had significant vision discrepancies between his eyes, he learned to compensate for this difference. He had permanent spots of vision loss where the laser was used in his surgeries.

Jones painted the 1983 woven watercolor self-portrait, "I see...a second chance", in the months following his reprieve from blindness. This work was also featured in the June 1984 issue of the American Artist magazine.

== Woven watercolor technique ==
Around 1979, Jones began experimenting with methods that were a bridge to his signature Woven Watercolor technique. The precursor to Woven Watercolor was something he called “Grid Paintings” or “Grid Technique” and a type of mosaic technique. The striped grid technique was achieved by taping/blocking off vertical strips, making a painting, removing tape when dry revealing raw watercolor paper. Then he would tape off the dried work and create a separate work in the untouched, previously taped, stripes. Once the watercolor work was dried, he superimposed an image in pencil. One was a crane head, and one was his face. He believed this gave the impression of a double exposure effect. Jones had a month-long exhibition at the Plainsman Museum in Aurora, NE in June 1979 titled "Landscapes, People, and the Grid Technique."

Jones often remarked in interviews that his new techniques created movement or animation into an otherwise static work. As his methods evolved, he experimented with a type of watercolor mosaic. He created two paintings of the same subject differing in hue and value. He cut the second painting into small squares and pasted every other square onto the first painting to make a composite work. This style resulted in a similar checkered pattern and pixilated appearance to a woven watercolor.

After the mosaic style, he began his signature woven watercolor technique where he completed to separate works of the same subject but in different hue and value, cut each painting into strips (one horizontal, one vertical), and wove the two stripped paintings into one composite work. Jones created over 70 woven works during his career. His study of pointillism influenced his woven watercolor technique as the weaving created similar dots of color next to one another. He also described the woven watercolor as an impressionistic technique of combining two pieces differing in color into a composite work.

== Related Links ==
Gale D Jones tribute site with bio and gallery
