= O'Hara's Wife =

- Theatrical release poster
- Directed by: William S. Bartman
- Written by: William S. Bartman; Joseph Scott Kierland; James Nasella
- Produced by: Peter S. Davis; William N. Panzer
- Starring: Edward Asner; Mariette Hartley; Tom Bosley; Perry Lang; Ray Walston; Jodie Foster
- Cinematography: Harry Stradling Jr.
- Edited by: George Berndt; Jim Bogardt
- Music by: Artie Butler
- Production companies: O'Hara Cinema Group; Oregon Partnership
- Distributed by: Producers Sales Organization
- Release date: 1982
- Running time: 87 minutes
- Country: United States
- Language: English

O'Hara's Wife is a 1982 American comedy-drama film directed by William Bartman and starring Edward Asner, Mariette Hartley and Jodie Foster. It is Bartman's sole directorial effort.

== Plot ==
Bob O'Hara is a hard-working lawyer, who tends to focus on his career at the expense of his health and children, Barbara and Rob. After his wife Harry dies, she returns as a ghost, advising him to slow down and adjust his priorities.

== Cast ==
- Edward Asner as Bob O'Hara
- Mariette Hartley as Harry O'Hara
- Jodie Foster as Barbara O'Hara
- Perry Lang as Rob O'Hara
- Tom Bosley as Fred O'Hara
- Ray Walston as Walter Tatum
- Allen Williams as Billy Tatum
- Mary Jo Catlett as Gloria
- Nelson Welch as Nelson Attleby
- Richard Schaal as Jerry Brad
- Nehemiah Persoff as Doctor Fischer
- Kelly Bishop as Beth Douglas
- Erik Kilpatrick as a police officer
- Frank Ronzio as Angelo
- Juanita Moore as Ethel
- Howard Mann as a moving man
- Tony Ballen as an assistant moving man
- Dean Santoro as an appraiser
- Barney Phillips as a small wino
- Fred Scheiwiller as a large wino
