= John Roy =

American painter

John Roy (September 13, 1930 – June 13, 2001) was a noted professor in the Art Department at the University of Massachusetts, Amherst from 1964 until his retirement in 1994. He continued to paint until his death in 2001. His work included pointillism and photorealism and he created a remarkable and highly original body of work that represents an important contribution to the history of late twentieth-century American painting.

Roy was a contemporary and colleague of Chuck Close, and the two influenced each other's work considerably. Roy was the subject of one of Close's more noted paintings.
