= Allen Williams (actor) =

American film and television actor

- Williams in M*A*S*H, 1982
- Born: Allen Victor Lee Williams III; December 31, 1944; Lebanon, Pennsylvania, U.S.
- Died: May 26, 2019 (aged 74)
- Occupations: Film and television actor

Allen Victor Lee Williams III (December 31, 1944 – May 26, 2019) was an American film and television actor. He was best known for playing the recurring role of Adam Wilson, the financial editor in the American drama television series Lou Grant.

== Life and career ==
Williams was born in Lebanon, Pennsylvania. He began his screen career in 1976, appearing in the ABC police procedural television series The Rookies. In the same year, he appeared in the television programs Medical Center, The Streets of San Francisco, Bert D'Angelo/Superstar, Maude, Rich Man, Poor Man Book II and Police Story. During his screen career, in 1978, he starred as President Abraham Lincoln in the television special Tom Edison, Lightning Slinger, and in 1979, he starred in the television specials Young Abe Lincoln and Abe Lincoln -- Freedom Fighter.

Later in his career, Williams guest-starred in numerous television programs including Cheers, M*A*S*H, The Rockford Files, Knight Rider, Taxi, Scarecrow and Mrs. King, Tour of Duty, Sabrina the Teenage Witch, 21 Jump Street and Perfect Strangers. He played the recurring role of Adam Wilson, the financial editor in the CBS drama television series Lou Grant, and the recurring role of Detective Behar in the CBS soap opera television series Knots Landing. He also played John Spector in Generations, and played Dr. Dellman in Days of Our Lives. He appeared in films such as Against All Odds, The Onion Field, Meteor and O'Hara's Wife.

Williams retired from acting in 2012, last appearing in the film Project 12.

== Death ==
Williams died on May 26, 2019, at the age of 74.
