= Georges Lemmen =

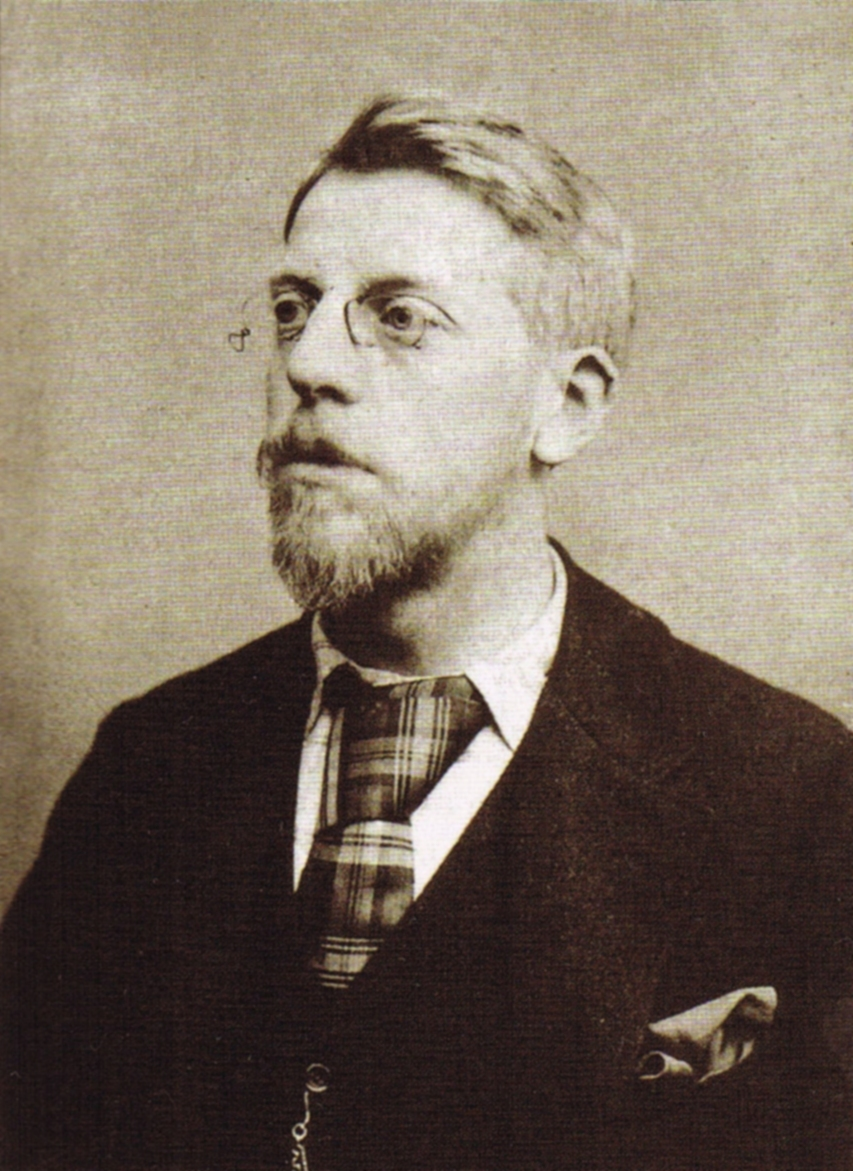
- Born: 25 November 1865; Schaerbeek, Belgium
- Died: 5 June or 5 July 1916; Brussels, Belgium
- Known for: painting
- Notable work: The Beach at Heist, Aline Marechal, Vase of Flowers
- Movement: Neo-impressionism, Post-Impressionism, modern art

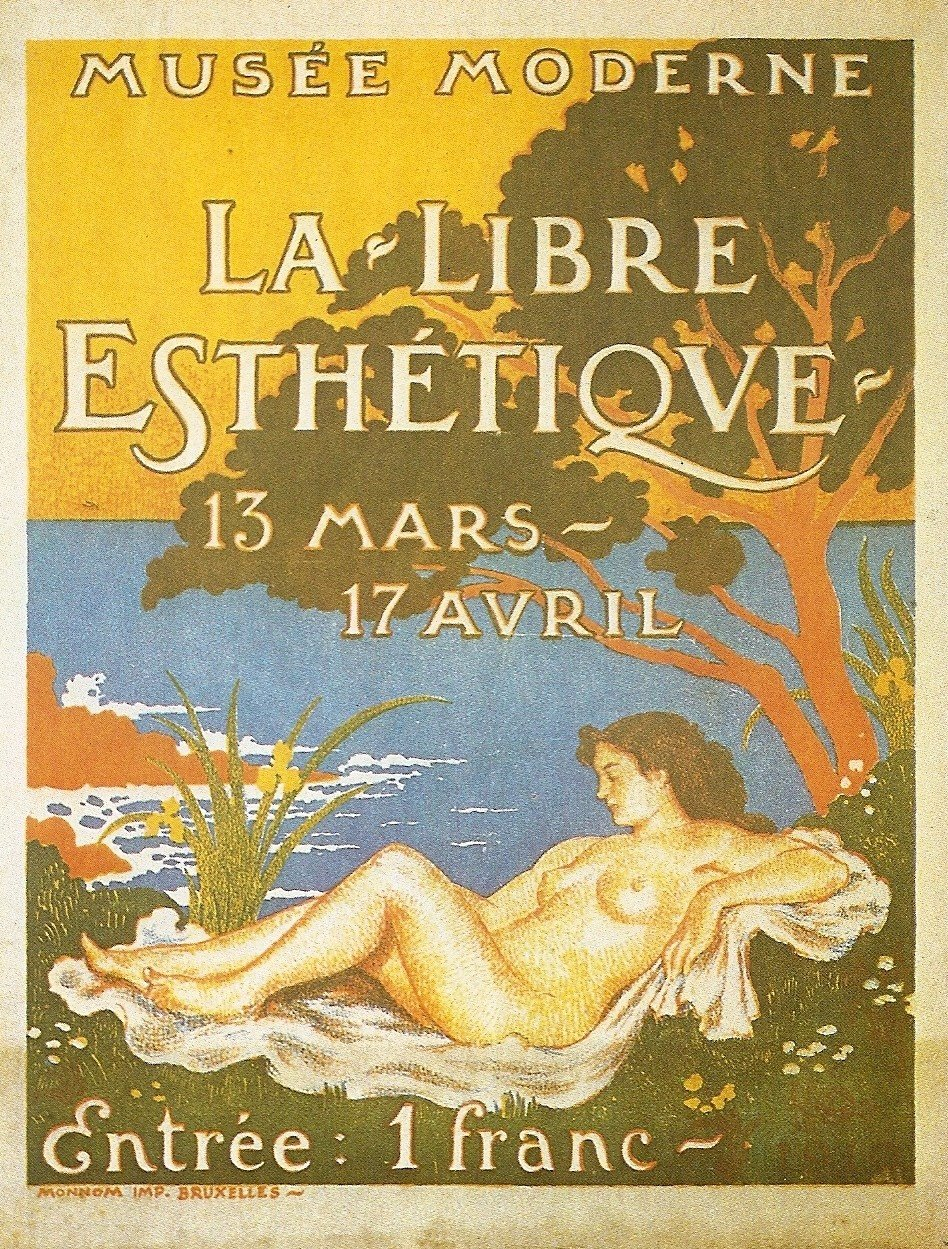
Exhibition poster for La Libre Esthétique, Designed by Georges Lemmen, 1910

Georges Lemmen (1865, Schaerbeek – 1916, Brussels) was a neo-impressionist painter from Belgium. He was a member of Les XX from 1888. His works include The Beach at Heist, Aline Marechal and Vase of Flowers. Yvonne Serruys studied in his workshop in Brussels from 1892 to 1894.

== Gallery ==
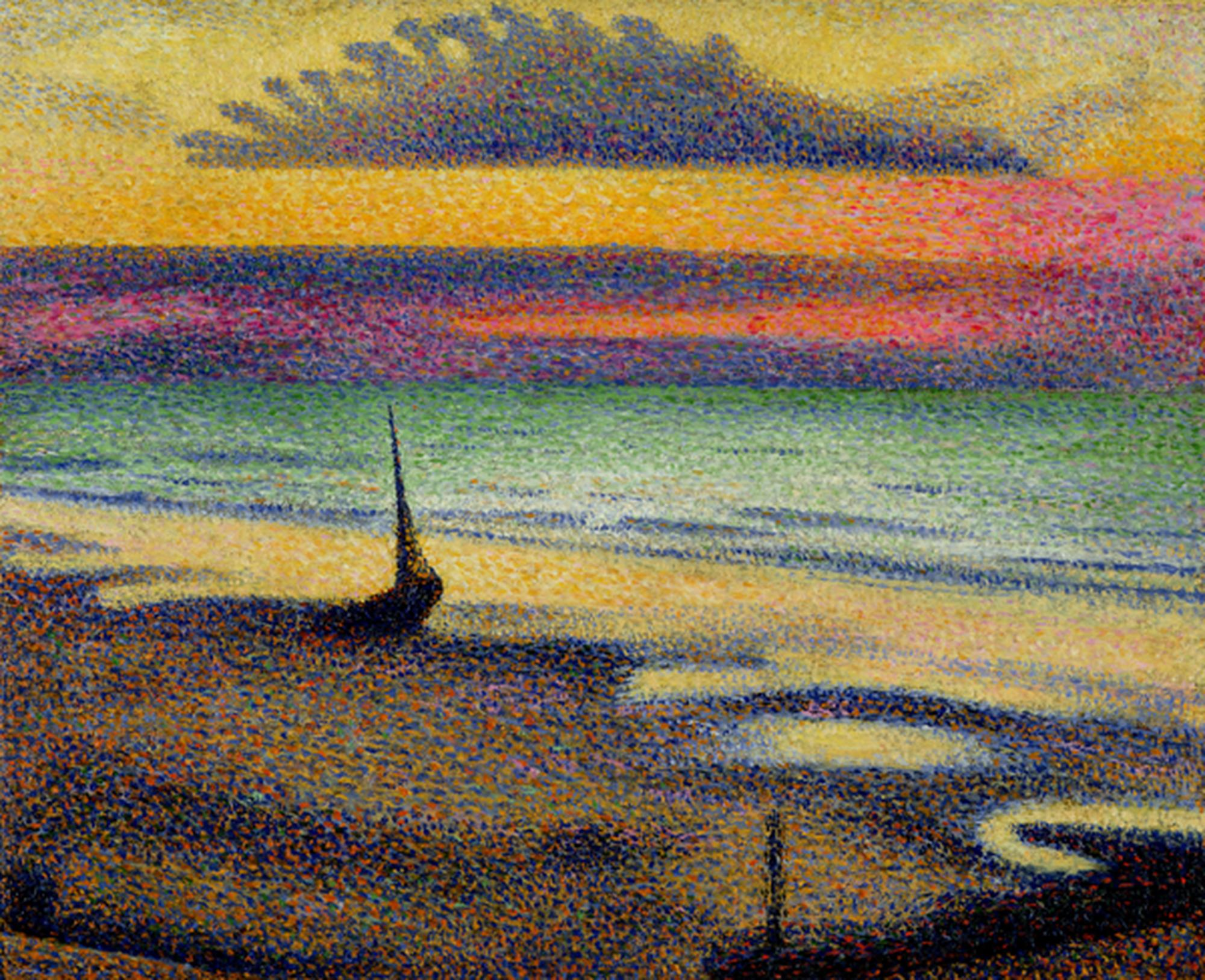
Plage a Heist (The Beach at Heist), c. 1891–92, Musée d'Orsay, Paris

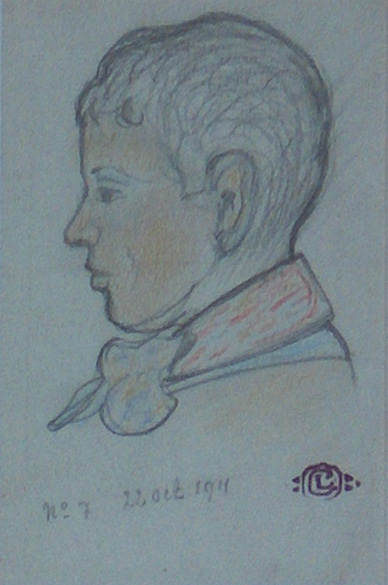
Profile of a young boy, colored drawing (1911)

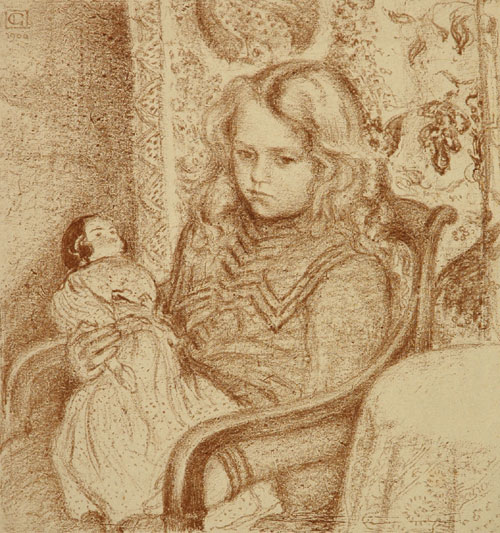
Girl with doll, 1904

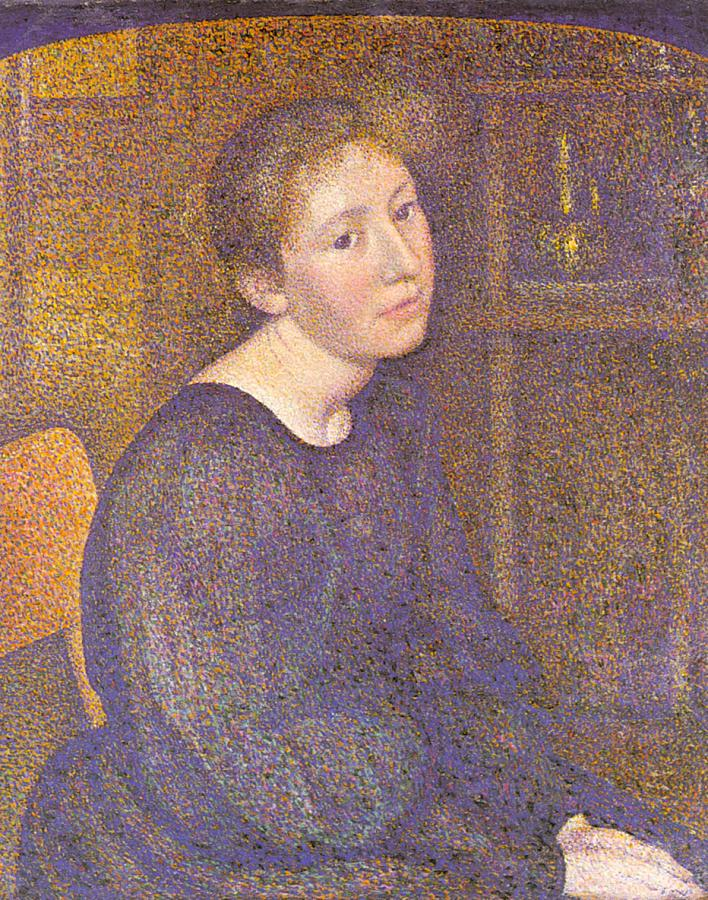
Portrait of Mme. Lemmen, 1893

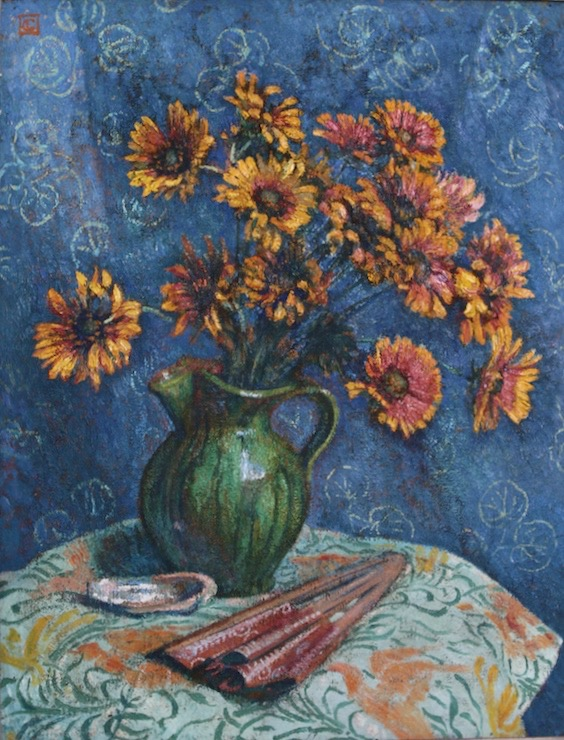

== Bibliography ==
- P. & V. Berko, "Dictionary of Belgian painters born between 1750 & 1875", Knokke 1981, p. 418.

== See also ==
- Pointillism
- Georges Seurat
- History of painting
- Western painting
- Post-Impressionism
