= Jerry Spagnoli =

American photographer (born 1956)

Jerry Spagnoli (New York, 1956), a photographer since the mid-1970s, is best known for his work with the daguerreotype process, a complex photographic technique invented in 1839 that produces images on highly polished, silver clad copper plates. Initiating his exploration of the daguerreotype in San Francisco in 1994, Spagnoli experimented with nineteenth-century materials and studied the effects achieved by early practitioners to understand the technical aspects of the process, as well as its expressive and visual potential as a medium. He began work on an ongoing series entitled “The Last Great Daguerreian Survey of the 20th Century” in 1995, continuing the series upon returning to the east coast in 1998. The project features views of the metropolis as well as images of historically significant events including the destruction of the World Trade Center on 9/11, the vigil following the disappearance of John F. Kennedy Jr., and Times Square at midnight on the eve of the new millennium. Considered the leading expert in the revitalization of the daguerreotype process, Spagnoli is also noted for his collaboration with artist Chuck Close on daguerreotype portraits and nudes.

Spagnoli’s interest in the characteristic qualities of photographic processes extends to other aspects of his work. In his “Photomicrograph” series Spagnoli explores how people, photographed at great distances onto a small piece of film and enlarged many times, are readable as human forms from the most minimal information. In “Pantheon,” a recent series of color photographs, Spagnoli placed a radiating sun at the center of each image, the effect of which is enhanced by his use of a pinhole camera. Recently this project has morphed into “Local Stories.” Exchanging the pinhole for a super-wide-angle lens the project has taken on a more documentarian agenda while retaining the preoccupation with the sun as a central motif. Of his work, Spagnoli comments, “Ultimately my use of various materials and methods is centered in my desire to make complicated stories out of the everyday world, which is my apparent subject matter. Photography allows me to engage viewers with images and ideas which are filtered through the abstracting apparatus of the camera and woven into the matrix of its rich history.”

== Collections ==
- The Whitney Museum of American Art, New York, NY
- The National Portrait Gallery, Washington DC
- The Chrysler Museum, Norfolk, VA
- The Fogg Museum, Boston, MA
- The High Museum, Atlanta, GA
- The Museum of Fine Arts, Boston MA
- The Museum of Modern Art, New York, NY
- The Nelson Atkins Museum, Kansas City, MO
- The Art Institute of Chicago, Chicago, IL
- The Oakland Museum, Oakland, CA
- The New York Historical Society, New York, NY
- The Museum of the City of New York, New York, NY
- The Cleveland Museum, Cleveland, OH
- Musee Carnavalet, Paris, France

== Books ==
- Daguerreotypes, Steidl Verlag, (2006)
- American Dreaming, Steidl Verlag, (Spring 2010)

=== In collaboration with Chuck Close ===
- A Couple of Ways of Doing Something, Chuck Close and Bob Holman, Aperture, New York, (2006)
- Chuck Close: Daguerreotypes, Demetrio Paparoni, Alberico Cetti Serbelloni Editor, (2002)

=== Other books featuring Spagnoli’s work ===
- The Journal of Contemporary Photography VI, (2004), “Flesh and Spirit: The Photomicrographs of Jerry Spagnoli”
- Photography’s Antiquarian Avant-Garde, Lyle Rexer, Abrams, (2002)
- The Photographic Arts, John Wood, University of Iowa Press, (1997), “Passed, Passing or to Come: The Conceptual Songs of Jerry Spagnoli”
