= Henri Delavallée =

French painter

Henri Delavallée (1862, Reims – 1943, Pont-Aven) was a French Post-Impressionist painter who became a member of the artists colony in Pont-Aven.

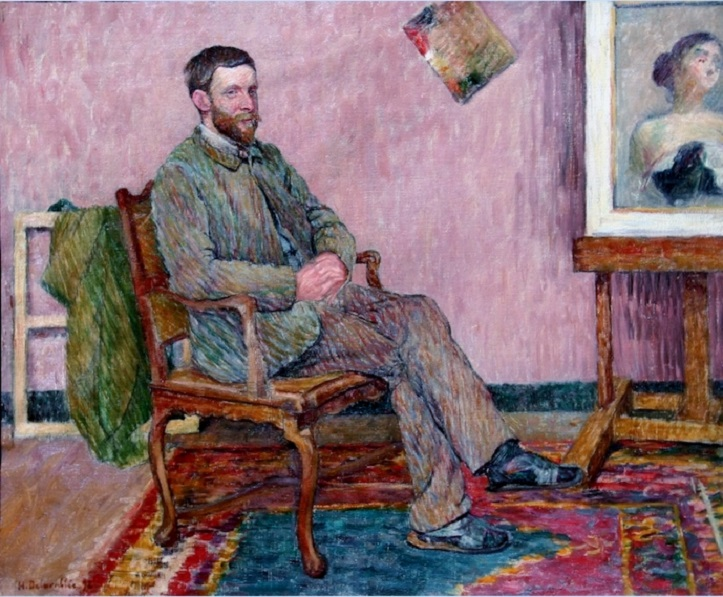
Delavallée Autoportrait

== Biography ==
A fantastic student at school, in 1879 Delavallée enrolled simultaneously at the Sorbonne and at the École des Beaux-Arts where he studied under the finest art teachers of the period: Carolus-Duran, Luc-Olivier Merson, Henri Lehmann and Ernest Hébert. He also met Gabrielle Moreau, his future wife, while he was there. In the early 1880s, one of his artist friends, Hersart du Buron, encouraged him to go to Brittany with him to find landscapes they could paint. They visited the island of Ushant, Le Faouët and Châteauneuf-du-Faou before reaching Pont-Aven, where they stayed with his friend's cousins. In 1886, during one of his many stays in the village, he met Paul Gauguin and Émile Bernard.

In 1887, thanks to his friend Félix Bracquemond, he was introduced to Camille Pissarro and Georges Seurat. He worked with Pissarro, whose approach he particularly appreciated, in Marlotte, producing works in the Divisionist and Pointillist styles. In 1889, he also made etchings. From 1891 to 1896, he exhibited at Paul Durand-Ruel's gallery, at the Société des Amis des Arts in Nantes, and at the Paris Salons. In 1894, he met Paul Gauguin in Pont-Aven. In May 1895, he exhibited three works at Liège. In 1896, the family left Paris for Constantinople where he and his wife mixed with Turkish high society. In 1901, they returned to France and established their home in Pont-Aven where they associated with Théodore Botrel. In 1941, the Galerie Saluden in Quimper put on a retrospective of his work. He died in 1943 in Pont-Aven where he is buried.

== Gallery ==
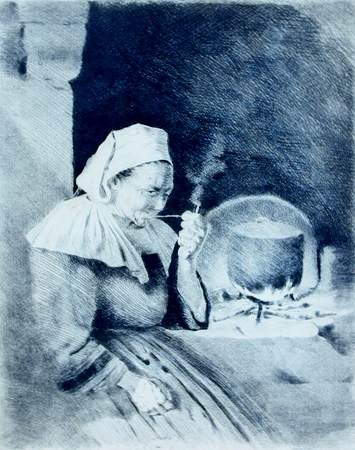
Henri Delavallée's engraving Bretonne fumant la pipe devant l'âtre

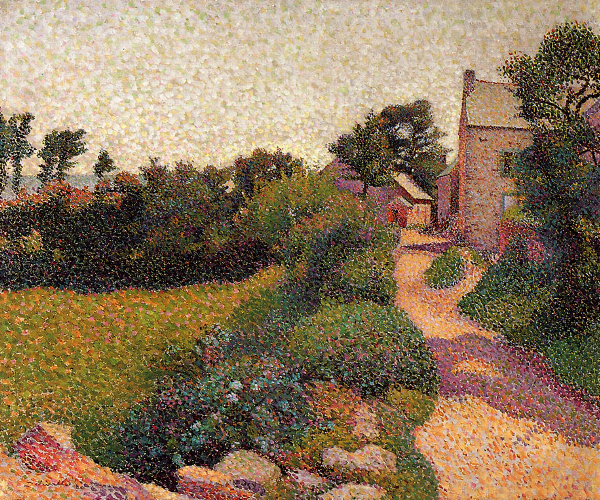
Henri Delavallée's La rue au soleil à Port-Manech. Painted around 1887

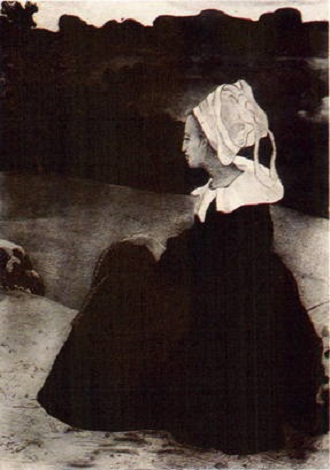
Henri Delavallée's Bretonne en noir dating to 1893 and held in the Quimper musée des beaux-arts

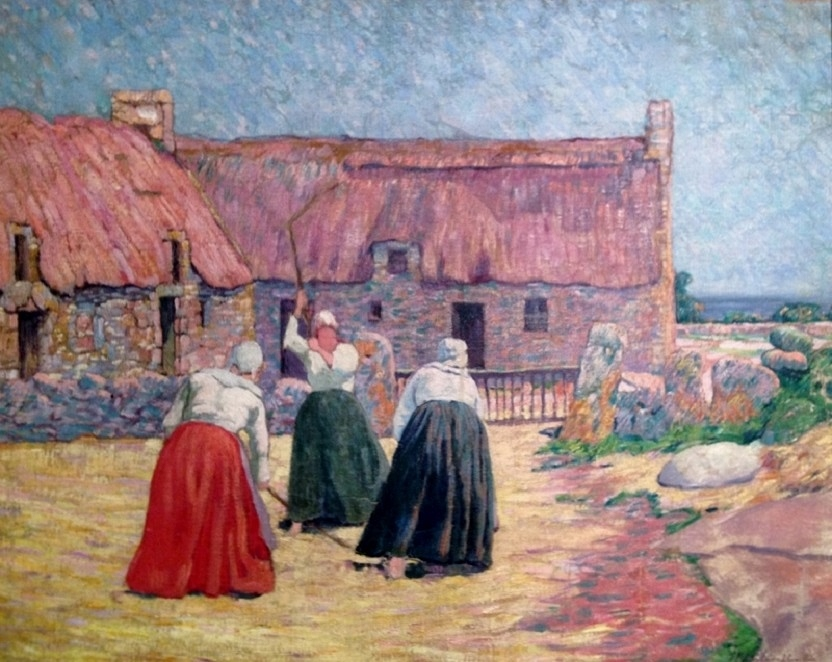
Henri Delavallée's Scène de battage. Women threshing.

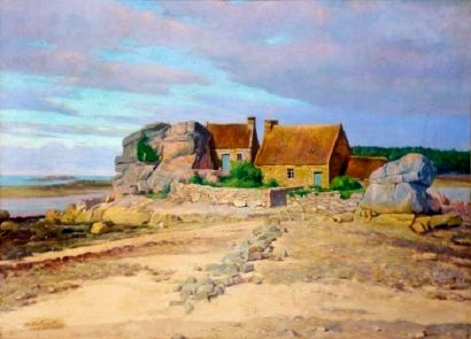
Henri Delavallée's Maisons en Bretagne. Houses in Brittany

== Bibliography ==
- Henri Delavallée, Daniel Morane, Musée de Pont-Aven: Henri Delavallée, 1862-1943: catalogue de l'oeuvre gravé, Musée de Pont-Aven, 1996, 64 pp.
