= William J. Clinton (Close) =

2006 painting

- Artist: Chuck Close
- Subject: Bill Clinton

William J. Clinton is a 2006 painting of Bill Clinton by American artist Chuck Close. It has been displayed in the National Portrait Gallery.

== See also ==
- Portraits of presidents of the United States
