= William S. Bartman =

American art patron

William S. Bartman (October 14, 1946 – September 15, 2005) was an American art patron, and founder of Art Resources Transfer.

== Life ==
He was born in Chicago, and grew up in Los Angeles.

He co-wrote and directed the 1982 film O'Hara's Wife, starring Ed Asner, Mariette Hartley and Jodie Foster.
