= Chuck Close =

American painter (1940–2021)

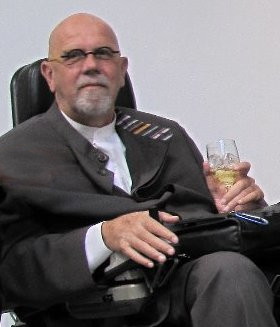
- Close in 2009
- Born: Charles Thomas Close; July 5, 1940; Monroe, Washington, U.S.
- Died: August 19, 2021 (aged 81); Oceanside, New York, U.S.
- Education: University of Washington (BA, 1962); Yale University (MFA)
- Known for: Photorealistic painter, photographer

Charles Thomas Close (July 5, 1940 – August 19, 2021) was an American painter, visual artist, and photographer who made massive-scale photorealist and abstract portraits of himself and others. Close also created photo portraits using a very large format camera. He adapted his painting style and working methods in 1988, after being paralyzed by an occlusion of the anterior spinal artery.

== Early life and education ==
Chuck Close was born in Monroe, Washington. His father, Leslie Durward Close, died in 1952 when Chuck was 11 years old. His cause of death is not widely specified, however according to the University of Washington Magazine he was 'always in ill health', which may have contributed to his death. His mother's name was Mildred Wagner Close. As a child, Close had a neuromuscular condition that made it difficult to lift his feet and a bout with nephritis that kept him out of school for most of sixth grade. In school, he did poorly due to his dyslexia, which was not diagnosed at the time.

Most of his early works were very large portraits based on photographs, using photorealism or hyperrealism, of family and friends, often other artists. Close said he had prosopagnosia (face blindness), and suggested that this condition is what first inspired him to do portraits. Author Graham Thompson writes "One demonstration of the way photography became assimilated into the art world is the success of photorealist painting in the late 1960s and early 1970s. It is also called super-realism or hyper-realism and painters like Richard Estes, Denis Peterson, Audrey Flack, and Chuck Close often worked from photographic stills to create paintings that appeared to be photographs."

In an interview with Phong Bui in The Brooklyn Rail, Close described an early encounter with a Jackson Pollock painting at the Seattle Art Museum: "I went to the Seattle Art Museum with my mother for the first time when I was 14. I saw this Jackson Pollock drip painting with aluminum paint, tar, gravel and all that stuff. I was absolutely outraged, disturbed. It was so far removed from what I thought art was. However, within 2 or 3 days, I was dripping paint all over my old paintings. In a way I've been chasing that experience ever since."

Close attended Everett Community College in 1958–1960. Local writer John Patric was an early anti-establishment intellectual influence on him, and a role model for the iconoclastic and theatric artist's persona Close learned to project in subsequent years.

In 1962, Close received his B.A. from the University of Washington in Seattle. In 1961, he was granted a scholarship to the Yale Summer School of Music and Art, and the following year entered the graduate degree program at Yale University, where he received his MFA in 1964. Among Close's classmates at Yale were Brice Marden, Vija Celmins, Janet Fish, Richard Serra, Nancy Graves, Jennifer Bartlett, Robert Mangold, and Sylvia Plimack Mangold.

After Yale, he studied at the Academy of Fine Arts Vienna on a Fulbright grant. When he returned to the United States, he worked as an art teacher at the University of Massachusetts. Close moved to New York City in 1967 and established himself in SoHo.

== Work ==
=== Style ===
Mark (1978–1979), acrylic on canvas. Metropolitan Museum of Art, New York, New York. Detail at right of eye. This is a photorealistic painting representative of Close's earlier style, in contrast to his later "pictorial syntax" using "many small marks of paint". Laboriously constructed from a series of cyan, magenta, and yellow airbrushed layers that imitated CMYK color printing, It took close to fourteen months to complete.

Lucas (1986–1987), oil and graphite on canvas. Metropolitan Museum of Art, New York, New York. Detail at right of eye. Representative of his "later, more colorful and painterly style", "the elements of the picture are seen as separate abstract markings" when viewed close-up, while simultaneously maintaining the illusion of a realistic portrait at a distance. The pencil grid and thin undercoat of blue is visible beneath the splotchy "pixels." The painting's subject is fellow artist Lucas Samaras.

Throughout his career, Close expanded his contribution to portraiture through the mastery of such varied drawing and painting techniques as ink, graphite, pastel, watercolor, conté crayon, finger painting, and stamp-pad ink on paper; printmaking techniques, such as mezzotint, etching, woodcuts, linocuts, and silkscreens; as well as handmade paper collage, Polaroid photographs, daguerreotypes, and Jacquard tapestries. His early airbrush techniques inspired the development of the ink jet printer.

Although commonly associated with photo realism and super-realism, Close rejected those terms on the basis that he was most interested in mark-making. He once joked to journalist Brandon Kosters that "the abstract expressionists like to talk about their work being figurative, and the figurative painters talk about being more abstract."

Close had been known for his skillful brushwork as a graduate student at Yale University. There, he emulated Willem de Kooning and seemed "destined to become a third-generation abstract expressionist, although with a dash of Pop iconoclasm". After a period in which he experimented with figurative constructions, Close began a series of paintings derived from black-and-white photographs of a female nude, which he copied onto canvas and painted in color. As he explained in a 2009 interview with Cleveland, Ohio's The Plain Dealer newspaper, he made a choice in 1967 to make art hard for himself and force a personal artistic breakthrough by abandoning the paintbrush. "I threw away my tools", Close said. "I chose to do things I had no facility with. The choice not to do something is in a funny way more positive than the choice to do something. If you impose a limit to not do something you've done before, it will push you to where you've never gone before." One photo of Philip Glass was included in his resulting black-and-white series in 1969, redone with watercolors in 1977, again redone with stamp pad and fingerprints in 1978, and also done as gray handmade paper in 1982.

Working from a gridded photograph, he built his images by applying one careful stroke after another in multi-colors or grayscale. He worked methodically, starting his loose but regular grid from the left hand corner of the canvas. His works are generally larger than life and highly focused. "One demonstration of the way photography became assimilated into the art world is the success of photorealist painting in the late 1960s and early 1970s. It is also called super-realism or hyper-realism and painters like Richard Estes, Denis Peterson, Audrey Flack, and Close often worked from photographic stills to create paintings that appeared to be photographs. The everyday nature of the subject matter of the paintings likewise worked to secure the painting as a realist object."

Close said he had prosopagnosia, also known as face blindness, in which he had difficulty recognizing new faces. By painting portraits, he was better able to recognize and remember faces. On the subject, Close said, "I was not conscious of making a decision to paint portraits because I have difficulty recognizing faces. That occurred to me twenty years after the fact when I looked at why I was still painting portraits, why that still had urgency for me. I began to realize that it has sustained me for so long because I have difficulty in recognizing faces."

Although his later paintings differed in method from his earlier canvases, the preliminary process remained the same. To create his grid work copies of photos, Close put a grid on the photo and on the canvas and copied cell by cell. Typically, each square within the grid is filled with roughly executed regions of color (usually consisting of painted rings on a contrasting background) which give the cell a perceived 'average' hue which makes sense from a distance. His first tools for this included an airbrush, rags, razor blade, and an eraser mounted on a power drill. His first picture with this method was Big Self Portrait, a black and white enlargement of his face to a 107.5 by 83.5 inches (273 cm × 212 cm) canvas, made in over four months in 1968, and acquired by the Walker Art Center in 1969. He made seven more black and white portraits during this period.

His later work branched into non-rectangular grids, topographic map style regions of similar colors, CMYK color grid work, and using larger grids to make the cell by cell nature of his work obvious even in small reproductions.

=== "The Event" ===
On December 7, 1988, Close felt a strange pain in his chest. That day he was at a ceremony honoring local artists in New York City and was waiting to be called to the podium to present an award. Close delivered his speech and then made his way across the street to Beth Israel Medical Center where he had a seizure which left him paralyzed from the neck down. The cause was diagnosed as a spinal artery collapse. He had also experienced neuromuscular problems as a child. Close called that day "The Event". For months, Close was in rehab strengthening his muscles with physical therapy; he soon had slight movement in his arms and could walk, yet only for a few steps. He relied on a wheelchair thereafter. Close spoke candidly about the effect disability had on his life and work in the book Chronicles of Courage: Very Special Artists written by Jean Kennedy Smith and George Plimpton and published by Random House.

However, Close continued to paint with a brush strapped onto his wrist, creating large portraits in low-resolution grid squares created by an assistant. Viewed from afar, these squares appear as a single, unified image which attempt photo-reality, albeit in pixelated form. Although the paralysis restricted his ability to paint as meticulously as before, Close had, in a sense, placed artificial restrictions upon his hyperrealist approach well before the injury. That is, he adopted materials and techniques that did not lend themselves well to achieving a photorealistic effect. Small bits of irregular paper or inked fingerprints were used as media to achieve astoundingly realistic and interesting results. Close proved able to create his desired effects even with the most difficult of materials to control. Close made a practice, during his final years, of portraying artists who are similarly invested in portraiture, like Cecily Brown, Kiki Smith, Cindy Sherman, and Zhang Huan.

=== Prints ===
Close was a printmaker throughout his career, with most of his prints published by Pace Editions, New York. He made his first serious foray into print making in 1972, when he moved himself and family to San Francisco to work on a mezzotint at Crown Point Press for a three-month residency. To accommodate him, Crown Point found the largest copper plate it could (36 inches wide) and purchased a new press, allowing Close to make a work that was 3 feet by 4 feet. In 1986 he went to Kyoto to work with Tadashi Toda, a highly respected woodblock printer.

In 1995, curator Colin Westerbeck used a grant from the Lannan Foundation to bring Close together with Grant Romer, director of conservation at the George Eastman House. From that time on, Close also continued to explore difficult photographic processes such as daguerreotype in collaboration with Jerry Spagnoli and sophisticated modular/cell-based forms such as tapestry. Close's photogravure portrait of artist Robert Rauschenberg, "Robert" (1998), appeared in a 2009 exhibition at the Heckscher Museum of Art in Huntington, New York, featuring prints from Universal Limited Art Editions. In the daguerreotype photographs, the background defines the limit of the image plane as well as the outline of the subject, with the inky pitch-black setting off the light, reflective quality of the subject's face.

In a 2014 interview with Terrie Sultan, Close said: "I've had two great collaborators in the God knows how many years I've been making prints. One was the late Joe Wilfer, who was called the 'prince of pulp' ... and now I'm working with Don Farnsworth in Oakland at ... Magnolia Editions: I do the watercolor prints with him, I do the tapestries with him. These are the most important collaborations of my life as an artist."

Since 2012, Magnolia Editions has published an ongoing series of archival watercolor prints by Close which use the artist's grid format and the precision afforded by contemporary digital printers to layer water-based pigment on Hahnemuhle rag paper such that the native behavior of watercolor is manifested in each print: "The edges of each pixel bleed with cyan, magenta, and yellow, creating a kind of three-dimensional fog effect behind the intended color swatches." The watercolor prints are created using more than 10,000 of Close's hand-painted marks which were scanned into a computer and then digitally rearranged and layered by the artist using his signature grid. These works were called Close's first major foray into digital imagery, with the artist himself having said, "It's amazing how precise a computer can be working with light and color and water." A New York Times review noted that the "exaggerated breakdown of the image, particularly when viewed at close range," that characterizes Close's work "is also apparent in ... [watercolor print] portraits of the artists Cecily Brown, Kiki Smith, Cindy Sherman, Kara Walker and Zhang Huan."

=== Tapestries ===
Close's wall-size tapestry portraits, in which each image is composed of thousands of combinations of woven colored thread, depict subjects including Kate Moss, Cindy Sherman, Lorna Simpson, Lucas Samaras, Philip Glass, Lou Reed, Roy Lichtenstein, and Close himself. They are produced in collaboration with Donald Farnsworth. Although many are translated from black-and-white daguerreotypes, all of the tapestries use multiple colors of thread. No printing is involved in their creation; colors and values appear to the viewer based on combinations of more than 17,800 colored warp (vertical) and weft (horizontal) threads, in an echo of Close's typical grid format. Close's tapestry series began with a 2003 black-and-white portrait of Philip Glass. In August 2013 he debuted two color self-portraits at Guild Hall in East Hampton, New York. In reviewing this exhibition, Marion Weiss wrote, "Close's Jacquard tapestries are not obviously fragmented, but are created by repeating multicolor warp and weft threads that are optically blended. Thus, portraits of Lou Reed and Roy Lichtenstein, for example, seem 'whole.' It's only when we get closer that we see the individual threads, which are woven together."

=== Commissions ===
In 2010, Close was commissioned by MTA Arts & Design to create twelve large mosaics, totaling more than 2,000 square feet (190 m^{2}), for the 86th Street subway station on the New York City Subway's Second Avenue Line in Manhattan.

Vanity Fair's 20th Annual Hollywood edition in March 2014 featured a portfolio of 20 Polaroid portraits of movie stars shot by Close, including Robert De Niro, Scarlett Johansson, Helen Mirren, Julia Roberts, and Oprah Winfrey. Close requested that his subjects be ready to be photographed without makeup or hair-styling and used a large-format 20 in × 24 in Polaroid camera for the close-ups.

A fragment of Close's portrait of singer-songwriter Paul Simon was used as the cover art for his 2016 album Stranger to Stranger. The right eye appears on the cover; the entire portrait is in the liner notes.

Close donated an original print of his "Self Portrait" in 2002 to the public library in Monroe, Washington, his hometown.

== Exhibitions ==
Close's first solo exhibition, held in 1967 at the University of Massachusetts Art Gallery, Amherst, featured paintings, painted reliefs, and drawings based on photographs of record covers and magazine illustrations. The exhibition captured the attention of the university administration which promptly closed it, citing the male nudity as obscene. The American Civil Liberties Union (ACLU) and the American Association of University Professors (AAUP) came to the defense of Close and a landmark court case ensued. A Massachusetts Supreme Court Justice decided in favor of the artist against the university. When the university appealed Close chose not to return to Boston, and ultimately the decision was overturned by an appeals court. (Close was later awarded an Honorary Doctorate of the Arts by the University of Massachusetts in 1995.)

Close credited the Walker Art Center and its then-director Martin Friedman for launching his career with the purchase of Big Self-Portrait (1967–1968) in 1969, the first painting he sold. His first one-man show in New York City was in 1970 at Bykert Gallery. His first print was the focus of a "Projects" exhibition at the Museum of Modern Art in 1972. In 1979 his work was included in the Whitney Biennial and the following year his portraits were the subject of an exhibition at the Walker Art Center. His work has since been the subject of more than 150 solo exhibitions including a number of major museum retrospectives. After Close abruptly canceled a major show of his work scheduled for 1997 at the Metropolitan Museum of Art, the Museum of Modern Art announced that it would present a major midcareer retrospective of the artist's work in 1998 (curated by Kirk Varnedoe and later traveling to the Hayward Gallery, London, and other galleries in 1999).

In 2003 the Blaffer Gallery at the University of Houston organized Chuck Close Prints: Process and Collaboration, a survey of his prints. The exhibition toured the world from 2003-2016. Among some of its stops after the Blaffer Gallery, were the Metropolitan Museum of Art, Miami Art Museum, Addison Gallery of American Art, Andover, Massachusetts, Boise Art Museum, Idaho, Museum der Moderne Salzburg, Austria, White Cube, London, and the Museum of Contemporary Art Sydney. The exhibition was curated by Terrie Sultan, director of the Blaffer Gallery, who also wrote the catalog ISBN 978-0-691-11576-4

His most recent retrospective – "Chuck Close Paintings: 1968/2006", at the Museo Nacional Centro de Arte Reina Sofia in Madrid in 2007 – travelled to the Ludwig Forum für Internationale Kunst in Aachen, Germany, and the State Hermitage Museum in St. Petersburg, Russia. He also participated in almost 800 group exhibitions, including documentas V (1972) and VI (1977), the Venice Biennale (1993, 1995, 2003), and the Carnegie International (1995).

In 2013, Close's work was featured in an exhibit at White Cube in Bermondsey, London. "Process and Collaboration" displayed not only a number of finished prints and paintings but included plates, woodblocks, and mylar stencils which were used to produce a number of prints.

In December 2014, his work was exhibited in Australia at the Museum of Contemporary Art in Sydney, which he visited.

In 2016, Close's work was the subject of a retrospective at the Schack Art Center in Everett, Washington, where he attended high school and community college.

In 2021, a solo exhibition «Chuck Close. Infinite», held at the Gary Tatintsian Gallery in Moscow, featured the artist's works in various techniques including oil painting, mosaic, and tapestry. The show became the artist's last lifetime exhibition.

Close's work is in the collections of most of the great international museums of contemporary art, including the Centre Georges Pompidou in Paris, the Tate Modern in London, and the Walker Art Center in Minneapolis who published Chuck Close: Self-Portraits 1967–2005 coauthored with curators Siri Engberg and Madeleine Grynsztejn.

On July 23, 2023, The New York Times reported that a long lost painting by Close may have been recovered.

== Public profile ==
=== Recognition ===
The recipient of the National Medal of Arts from President Bill Clinton in 2000, the New York State Governor's Art Award, and the Skowhegan Arts Medal, among many others, Close received over 20 honorary degrees including one from Yale University, his alma mater. In 1990, he was elected into the National Academy of Design as an Associate Academician, and became a full Academician in 1992. New York City Mayor Michael R. Bloomberg appointed the artist to the municipality's Cultural Affairs Advisory Commission, a body mandated by the City Charter to advise the mayor and the cultural affairs commissioner. Close painted President Clinton in 2006 and photographed President Barack Obama in 2012. In 2010 he was appointed by Obama to the President's Committee on the Arts and Humanities. He resigned from the President's Committee in August 2017, co-signing a letter of resignation that said in reference to President Donald Trump, "Ignoring your hateful rhetoric would have made us complicit in your words and actions."

In 2005, composer Philip Glass wrote a musical portrait of Close. The composition, a 15-minute piece for solo piano, was the idea of Bruce Levingston, a concert pianist, who commissioned it through the Premiere Commission and who performed the piece at a recital at Alice Tully Hall that year.

=== Art market ===
Close was represented by the Pace Gallery (in New York City) from 1977, and subsequently by White Cube (in London) from 1999.

The artist's most expensive works sold at auction:

1. $4,300,000 – John, 1971. Sotheby's, May 10, 2005.
2. $2,850,000 – Phil, 1983. Sotheby's, Nov 14, 2006.
3. $2,700,000 – Eric, 1990. Sotheby's, May 10, 2005.
4. $2,500,000 – Gwynne, 1982. Christie's, May 11, 2004.
5. $2,405,000 – Self–Portrait, 2007. Christie's, Nov 09, 2015.

=== Fundraising and community service ===
In 1992, Close was one of 10 artists who volunteered to mentor economically deprived teens in a summer long photography program, Art Works: Teenagers and Artists Collaborate on the Polaroid 20 x 24 Camera, produced by artist and curator Janeil Engelstad, The Education Project and Polaroid.

In 2007, Close was honored by the New York Stem Cell Foundation and donated artwork for an exclusive online auction.

In September 2012, Magnolia Editions published two tapestry editions and three print editions by Close depicting President Barack Obama. The first tapestry was unveiled at the Mint Museum in North Carolina in honor of the Democratic National Convention. These tapestries and prints were sold as a fundraiser to support the Obama Victory Fund. A number of the works were signed by both Close and Obama. Close previously sold work at auction to raise funds for the campaigns of Hillary Clinton and Al Gore.

In October 2013, Close donated a watercolor print of Genevieve Bahrenburg and a watercolor print self-portrait to ARTWALK NY, a cause that benefits the Coalition for the Homeless. In the same year work by Close was also sold to benefit the Lunchbox Fund.

Close was one of eight artists who volunteered in 2013 to participate in President Barack Obama's Turnaround Arts initiative, which aims to improve low-performing schools by increasing student "engagement" through the arts. Close mentored 34 students in the sixth through eighth grades at Roosevelt School in Bridgeport, Connecticut, one of eight schools in the nation to participate in this public-private partnership developed in cooperation with the U.S. Department of Education and the White House Domestic Policy Council. Close was honored by mayor Bill Finch with a key to the city at the November 7 reception at the Housatonic Community College Museum of Art, where five of Close's watercolor prints were exhibited alongside artwork by students participating in the program.

=== In the media ===
In 1998, PBS broadcast documentary filmmaker Marion Cajori's Emmy-nominated short, "Chuck Close: A Portrait in Progress." In 2007, Cajori made "Chuck Close", a full-length expansion of the first film. British art critic Christopher Finch wrote a biography, Chuck Close: Life, which was published in 2010, a sequel of sorts to Finch's 2007 book, Chuck Close: Work, a career-spanning monograph.

Another documentary film was made on Close in 1998, titled Chuck Close: Eye To Eye: ART/New York No. 48, by his classmate at Yale University Paul Tschinkel.

=== Sexual harassment allegations ===
On December 20, 2017, The New York Times and The Huffington Post published stories detailing two women accusing Close of sexual misconduct, saying Close invited the women to his studio to pose for what they thought would be portraits, and then Close asked them to pose nude and made vulgar comments to them. Their accounts were of alleged sexual harassment in 2007 and 2013. In response to the accusations, Close issued a statement to The New York Times, saying, "If I embarrassed anyone or made them feel uncomfortable, I am truly sorry, I didn't mean to. I acknowledge having a dirty mouth, but we're all adults". On January 16, 2018, Hyperallergic published the accounts of four more women who alleged Close harassed them. Their accounts were of alleged sexual harassment from 2001, 2009, and 2013. Most of the allegations were from women in their 20s, during the time that Close was in his 60s and 70s. Many of the allegations were from college students, including from Yale University. Following the allegations, the Dean of the Yale School of Art, Marta Kuzma, decided that "in the best interest of the students, faculty, and greater community of the Yale School of Art that Mr. Close will no longer serve as a member of the Dean's Council".

The National Gallery of Art cancelled a Chuck Close exhibition, planned to open May 2018, due to the allegations.

After Close died, his neurologist, Thomas M. Wisniewski, said that Close's inappropriate sexual behavior, alleged to have occurred from at least 2001 to 2013, could be attributed to his 2015 diagnosis of frontotemporal dementia. Wisniewski said that Close "was very disinhibited and did inappropriate things, which were part of his underlying medical condition", and that this type of dementia "destroys that part of the brain that governs behavior and inhibits base instincts", adding that "sexual inappropriateness and disastrous financial decisions are common presenting symptoms".

== Personal life ==
Close lived and worked in Bridgehampton and Long Beach, New York (both on the south shore of Long Island), and New York City's East Village. He had two daughters with Leslie Rose. They divorced in 2011. Close married artist Sienna Shields in 2013. They later divorced.

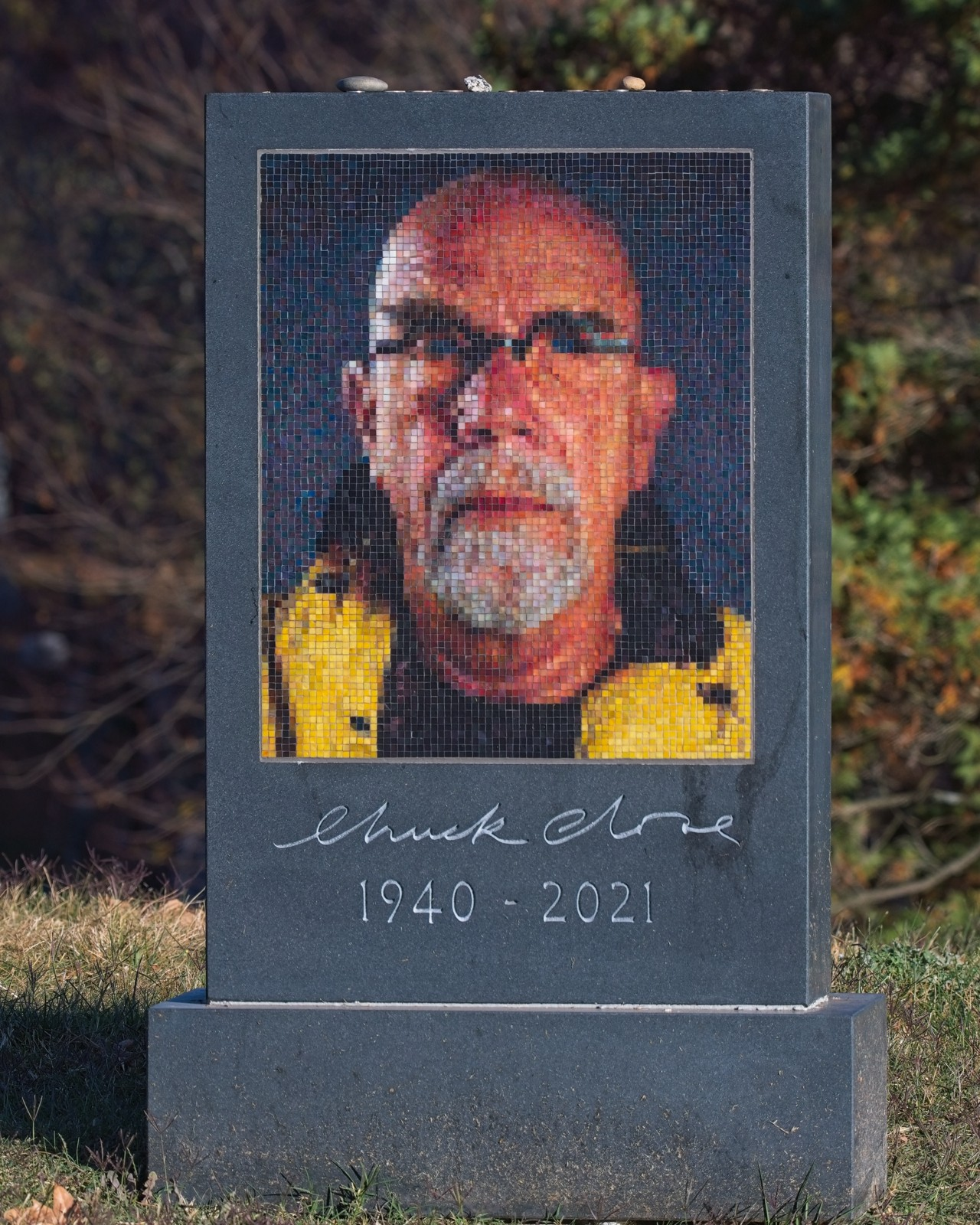
Tombstone of Chuck Close in Green-Wood Cemetery. It features a mosaic version of his Self-Portrait (Yellow Raincoat) (2013).

Close was diagnosed with frontotemporal dementia in 2015. He died on August 19, 2021, in Oceanside, New York, at the age of 81, from congestive heart failure. He was remembered by NBC News as "a painter, photographer and printmaker best known for his monumental grid portraits and photo-based paintings of family and famous friends."

== See also ==
- List of Chuck Close subjects
- The Portrait Now

== Sources ==
- Bartman, William; Kesten, Joanne, eds. (1997). The Portraits Speak: Chuck Close in Conversation with 27 of his subjects. A.R.T. Press, New York. ISBN 0-923183-18-3.
- Greenberg, Jan; Sandra Jordan (1998). Chuck Close Up Close. DK Publishing. ISBN 0-7894-2658-7.
- Greenough, Sarah; Nelson, Andrea; Kennel, Sarah; Waggoner, Diane; Ureña, Leslie (2015). The Memory of Time: Contemporary Photographs at the National Gallery of Art. National Gallery of Art. ISBN 978-0500544495.
- Wei, Lilly (essay) (2009). Chuck Close: Selected Paintings and Tapestries 2005–2009. PaceWildenstein. ISBN 978-1-930743-99-8.
