= Le Chahut =

Painting by Georges Seurat

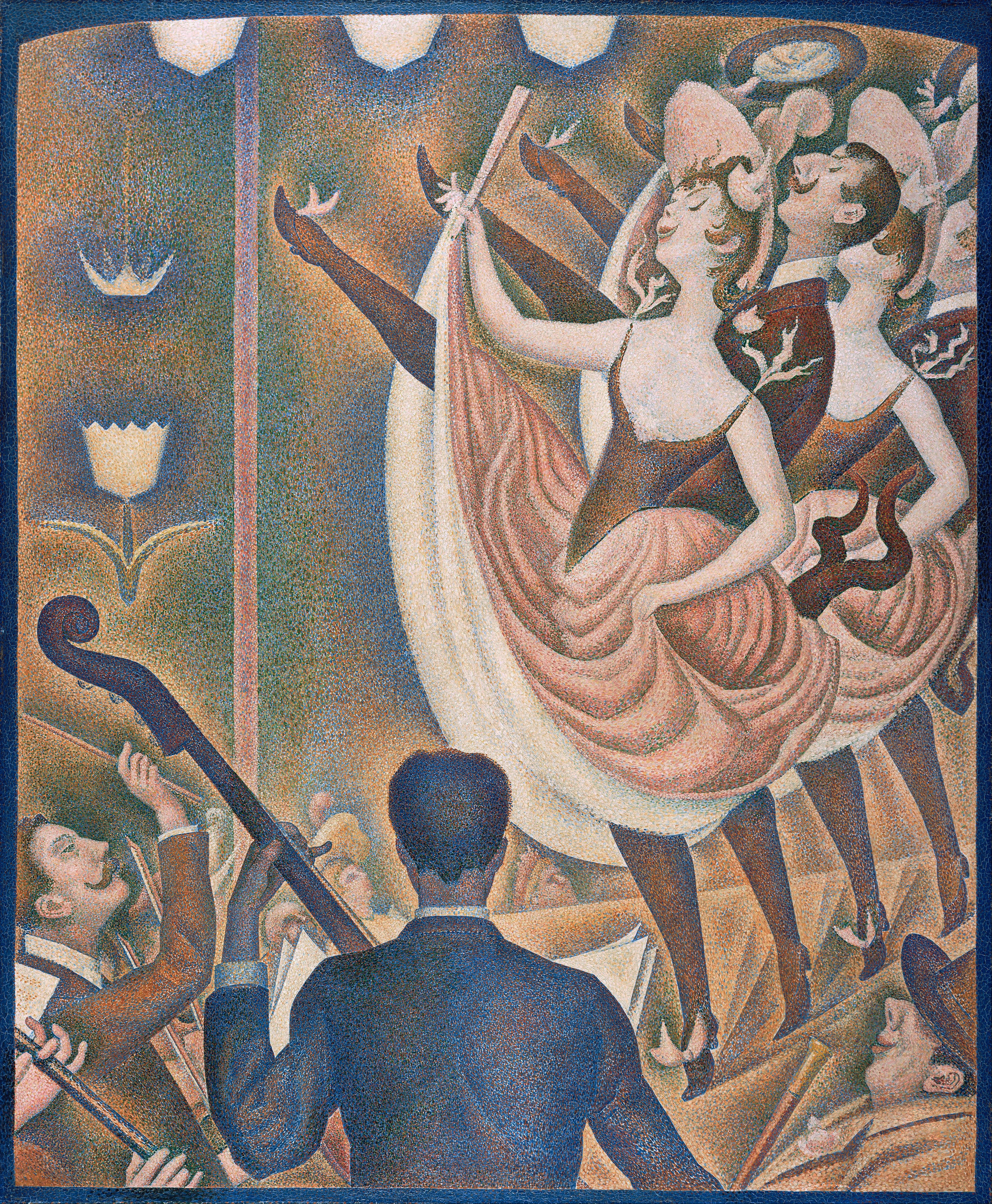
- Artist: Georges Seurat
- Year: 1889–90
- Medium: Oil on canvas
- Dimensions: 170 cm × 141 cm (66.92 in × 55.12 in)
- Location: Kröller-Müller Museum, Otterlo, Netherlands
- Website: Museum page

Le Chahut (English: The Can-can) is a Neo-Impressionist painting by Georges Seurat, dated 1889–90. It was first exhibited at the 1890 Salon de la Société des Artistes Indépendants (titled Chahut, cat. no. 726) in Paris. Chahut became a target of art critics, and was widely discussed among Symbolist critics.

The painting—representing a can-can at the Moulin Rouge—influenced the Fauves, Cubists, Futurists and Orphists.

Formerly in the collection of French Symbolist poet and art critic Gustave Kahn, Chahut is located at the Kröller-Müller Museum in Otterlo, Netherlands.

== Description ==
Le Chahut is an oil painting on canvas measuring 170 by 141 cm (67 x 55 in). Seurat employed a Divisionist style, with pointillist dots of color. The work is dominated by a color scheme that tends toward the red end of the spectrum, of earth tones that draw from a palette of browns, tans, warm grays, and blues, interspersed with not just the primary colors (reds and yellows), nor even with the six principal colors, but with eighteen mixtures on his palette prior to application on the canvas (any of which could be mixed with white). A deeper blue border painted around the edge of the canvas culminates in a shallow arch on the upper edge.

Le Chahut is a conspicuous example of Seurat’s pointillist technique. The modulation of light and shadow throughout the work is obtained by the use of small dots of color juxtaposed side by side while alternating in both intensity and concentrations. The dots are meant to fuse in the eye of the viewer to create the impression of mixed colors when observed from a distance. While the Impressionists had focused their attention on the harmony of colors based on similar or related hues (only partially separated), the Neo-Impressionists harmony had been based on contrasting hues, pitted one against the other; resulting in a vibrating mélange optique (the optical mixture in the observer's eye).

The painting is divided into three principal spaces. Musicians occupy the lower left section, one of whom is centrally located, his back turned toward the viewer, with his double-bass erected to the left. A row of dancers, two women and two men with their legs raised, occupy the upper right. They are characterized by curves and rhythmic repetition, creating a synthetic sense of dynamical movement. The background consists of ornate cabaret-style lighting fixtures, and a few members of the audience sitting in the front row, their eyes fixed on the performance. On the lower right another client is staring with a sidelong glance, indicative of sexual desire or sly and malicious intent; the archetype of a male voyeur, often portrayed in mid-century journalistic illustrations of the can-can.

== Background ==
Chahut (literally meaning noise or uproar) is an alternative name for the can-can, a provocative, sexually charged dance that first appeared in the ballrooms of Paris around 1830. The style of dance caused a scandal due to the high kicks and other gestures of the arms and legs. Leading up to the 1890s, the dance transited from individuals in ballrooms to stage performances by a chorus line in such places as the Moulin Rouge in Montmartre.

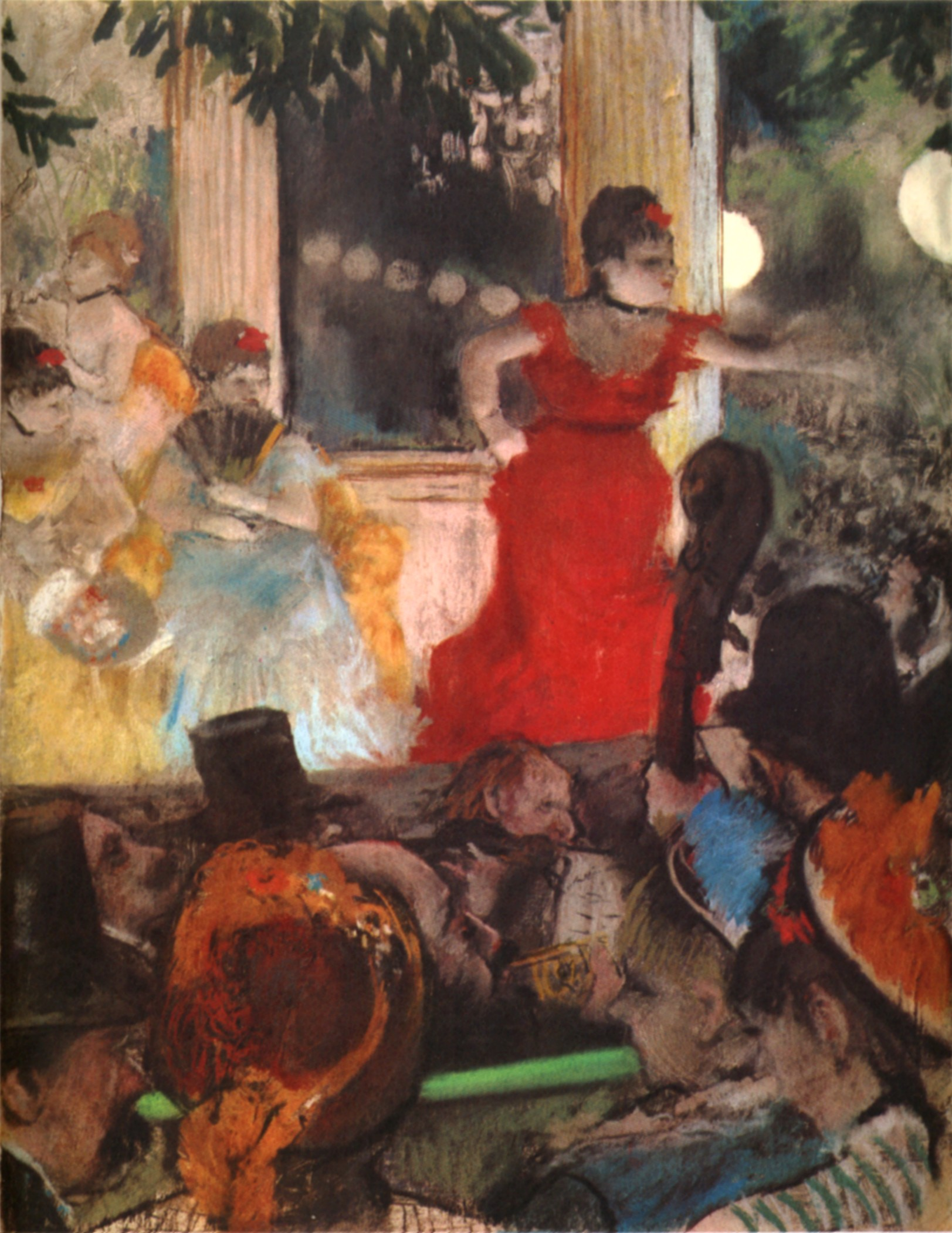
Edgar Degas,1876-77, Café Concert at Les Ambassadeurs, Musée des beaux-arts de Lyon

"Compared with Degas's Café-concert", writes art historian Robert Herbert, "the kind of work presaging Seurat's, the Chahut dancers are lined up with the repetitive rhythms of ornamental art. Parallel to the surface rather than spiraling into depth, they tilt or unfold in staccato bursts that fairly jump in our vision. Indeed, ever since the exhibition of Baignade six years earlier, in 1884, Seurat had progressively flattened his major compositions and increased the number of small accents typical of decorative art, such as zigzags, darting curves, flaring rays, repeated parallels, and nonreceding flat zones."

Seurat focuses on an upward movement of lines throughout the painting—"an extremely complicated machinery of lines" writes art historian John Rewald—giving the illusion of a high-spirited ambience of both dance and music. The caricatural figures are treated stiffly and imposingly, with humor and gaiety. The anti-naturalist tone of Chahut, with its primacy of expression over appearance and its eloquent use of lines and color, reflects the influence of both Charles Blanc and Humbert de Superville. Humbert's theory inspired Blanc's idea that lines (just as colors) induce feelings. The direction of a line changes the expression, and are therefore signs of emotion. Horizontal lines are synonymous with calmness, by association with equilibrium, duration and wisdom, while expansive lines embody gaiety, by virtue of their association with expansion, inconstancy and voluptuousness. Chahut's voluptuous expression and upward linear schematic embodies the Humbert-Blanc qualities and features of gaiety.

Seurat makes use, too, of Charles Henry's theories on the emotional and symbolic expression of lines and colors, and the works of Michel Eugène Chevreul and Ogden Rood on complementary colors. Seurat was also influenced by Japanese prints, and the graphic works of Jules Chéret. While Seurat acknowledges Henry as an influence for his "esthétique", Humbert's and Blanc are not mentioned. Though in theory Seurat clearly pays debt to his predecessors, in practice Chahut stands apart. Its forms are not abstract, but schematic and perfectly recognizable as the popular social milieu within which Seurat had been plunged since his move to Montmartre in 1886; with its sexually provocative subject matter (revealing legs and undergarments) inspired by burlesque dancing of Montmartre performers, café-concerts, theaters, ballrooms, music halls, vaudevilles, and fashionable Parisian nightlife.

Jules Christophe, Seurat's friend who interviewed him for a short biography published in spring 1890, described Le Chahut as

the end of a fanciful quadrille on the stage of a Montmartre cafe-concert: a spectator, half show-off, half randy investigator, who smells, one might say, with an eminently uplifted nose; an orchestra leader with hieratic gesture, seen from the back; some hands on a flute; and, with partners having serpentine suit tails, two young dancers in evening dress, skirts flying up, thin legs distinctly elevatory, with laughs on upraised lips, and provocative noses. On these working-class parisiennes [parisiennes de faubourgs], Georges Seurat, the painter of these delicacies, nonetheless confers the nearly sacred character of priestesses accomplishing rites... All his paintings offer little more than ascending lines (above the perpendicular [he meant to write "horizontal"]), which, in M. Charles Henry's system, are encharged with expressing gaiety; do they express it?

== Reception ==
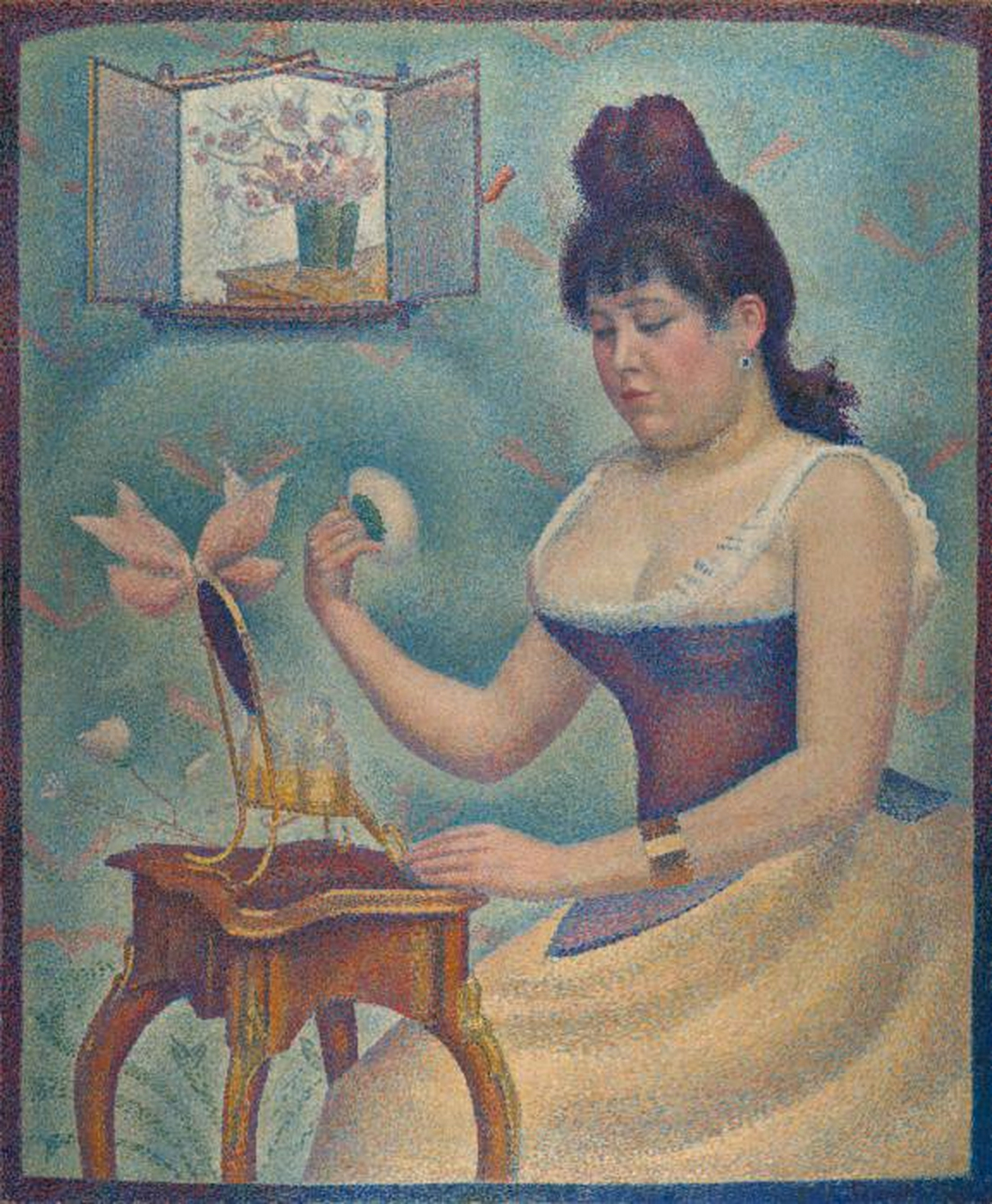
Georges Seurat, 1889-90, Jeune femme se poudrant (Young Woman Powdering Herself), oil on canvas, 95.5 x 79.5 cm, Courtauld Institute of Art

Chahut was exhibited at the Salon des Indépendants, 20 March–27 April 1890, eclipsing his other large entry: Jeune femme se poudrant (Young Woman Powdering Herself), to which critics at the time paid little attention. Chahut, the larger and more progressively modern of the two, was widely discussed among Symbolist critics, such as Arsène Alexandre, Jules Christophe, Gustave Kahn, Georges Lecomte, Henry van de Velde, Emile Verhaeren, and Téodor de Wyzewa. Two themes stood out: the Montmartre subject matter, and its incarnation of Henry's theories of linear expression. The painting was not liberally praised, as critics perceived its linear composition as overly schematic. Yet due to Chahut's anti-naturalist elements, its hieratic formalism and ritualistic components, Seurat was seen as an innovator. Their interpretations unintentionally paralleled the terms and concepts of Charles Blanc, whose anti-naturalist approach continued to inspire Seurat. Blanc commented on Egyptian art with a syntax the Symbolists may have used for Chahut:

The figures in Egyptian bas-relief, writes Blanc, "are accentuated in a concise, summary manner, not without finesse but without details. The lines are straight and long, the posture stiff, imposing, and fixed. The legs are usually parallel and held together. The feet touch or point in the same direction and are exactly parallel... In this solemn and cabalistic pantomime, the figure conveys signs rather than gestures; it is in a position rather than in action."

John Rewald writes of both Le Chahut and Le Cirque:

The figures in these paintings are dominated by monotony or joy (there is no sadness in the pictures of Seurat) and are, of course, governed by strict rules, being controlled by that play of line and color whose laws Seurat had studied. In these canvases Seurat, without yielding in any way to the literary or the picturesque, rehabilitated the subject which had been relinquished by the impressionists. His works are "exemplary specimens of a highly developed decorative art, which sacrifices the anecdote to the arabesque, nomenclature to synthesis, the fugitive to the permanent, and confers on nature—weary at last of its precarious reality—an authentic reality," wrote Fénéon

== Influence ==
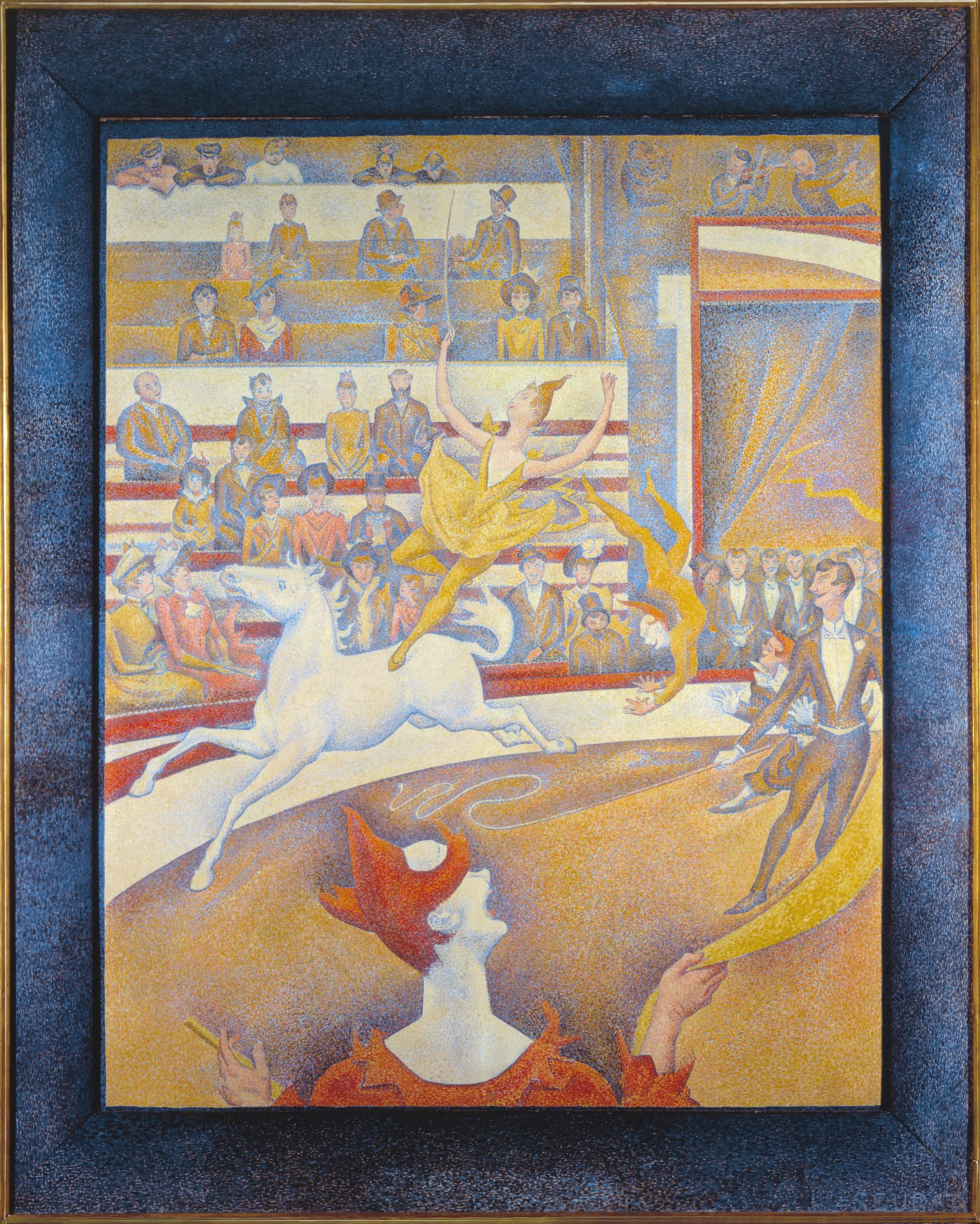
Georges Seurat, 1891, Le Cirque (The Circus), oil on canvas, 185 x 152 cm, Musée d'Orsay, Paris

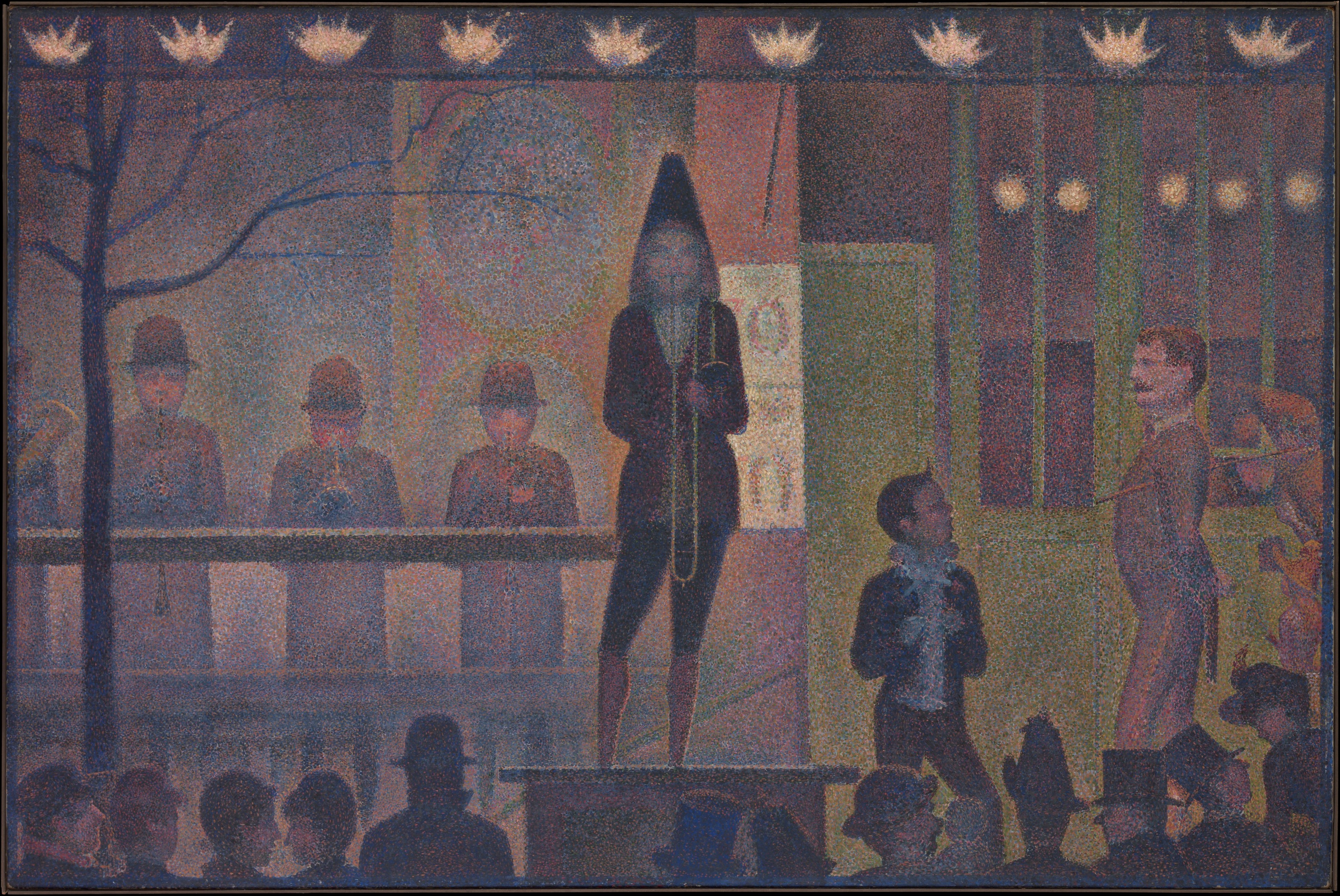
Georges Seurat, 1887-88, Parade de cirque (Circus Sideshow), oil on canvas, 99.7 x 149.9 cm, Metropolitan Museum of Art, New york

By 1904 Neo-Impressionism had evolved considerably, in a move away from nature, away from imitation, toward the distillation of essential geometric shapes and harmonious movements. These forms were considered superior to nature because they contained idea, representing the dominance of the artist over nature. "Harmony means sacrifice", wrote Henri-Edmond Cross, and much of early Neo-Impressionism was vacated. Cross, Paul Signac, along with Henri Matisse, Jean Metzinger, Robert Delaunay, André Derain (of the younger generation) now painted with large brushstrokes that could never blend in the eye of the observer. Pure bold colors (reds, blues, yellows, greens and magentas) bounced off the manifold of their canvas, "making them as free of the trammels of nature", writes Herbert, "as any painting then being done in Europe."

The work of Paul Cézanne had been greatly influential during the expressionistic phase of proto-Cubism (between 1908 and 1910), while the work of Seurat, with its flatter, more linear structures captured the attention of the Cubists from 1911. Seurat had been the founder of Neo-Impressionism, its most innovative and fervent protagonist, and proved to be one of the most influential in the eyes of the emerging avant-garde; many of whom—such as Jean Metzinger, Robert Delaunay, Gino Severini and Piet Mondrian—transited through a Neo-Impressionist phase, prior to their Fauve, Cubist or Futurist endeavors.

"With the advent of monochromatic Cubism in 1910–1911," writes Herbert, "questions of form displaced color in the artists' attention, and for these Seurat was more relevant. As a result of several exhibitions, his paintings and drawings were easily seen in Paris, and reproductions of his major compositions circulated widely among the Cubists. The Chahut was called by André Salmon 'one of the great icons of the new devotion', and both it and the Cirque (Circus), Musée d'Orsay, Paris, according to Guillaume Apollinaire, 'almost belong to Synthetic Cubism'."

The concept was well established among the French artists that painting could be expressed mathematically, in terms of both color and form; and this mathematical expression resulted in an independent and compelling 'objective truth', perhaps more so than the objective truth of the object represented.

Indeed, the Neo-Impressionists had succeeded in establishing an objective scientific basis in the domain of color (Seurat addresses both problems in Circus and Dancers). Soon, the Cubists were to do so in both the domain of form and dynamics; Orphism would do so with color too.

Jean Metzinger, 1912, Danseuse au café (Dancer in a café), oil on canvas, 146.1 x 114.3 cm, Albright-Knox Art Gallery, Buffalo, New York. Published in Au Salon d'Automne "Les Indépendants" 1912, Exhibited at the 1912 Salon d'Automne

Gino Severini, 1912, Dynamism of a Dancer (Dinamismo di una danzatrice, Ballerina di chahut), oil on canvas, 60 x 45 cm, Jucker Collection, Pinacoteca di Brera, Milan

Gino Severini, 1912, Dancer at Pigalle, oil and sequins on sculpted gesso on artist's canvasboard, 69.2 x 49.8 cm, Baltimore Museum of Art

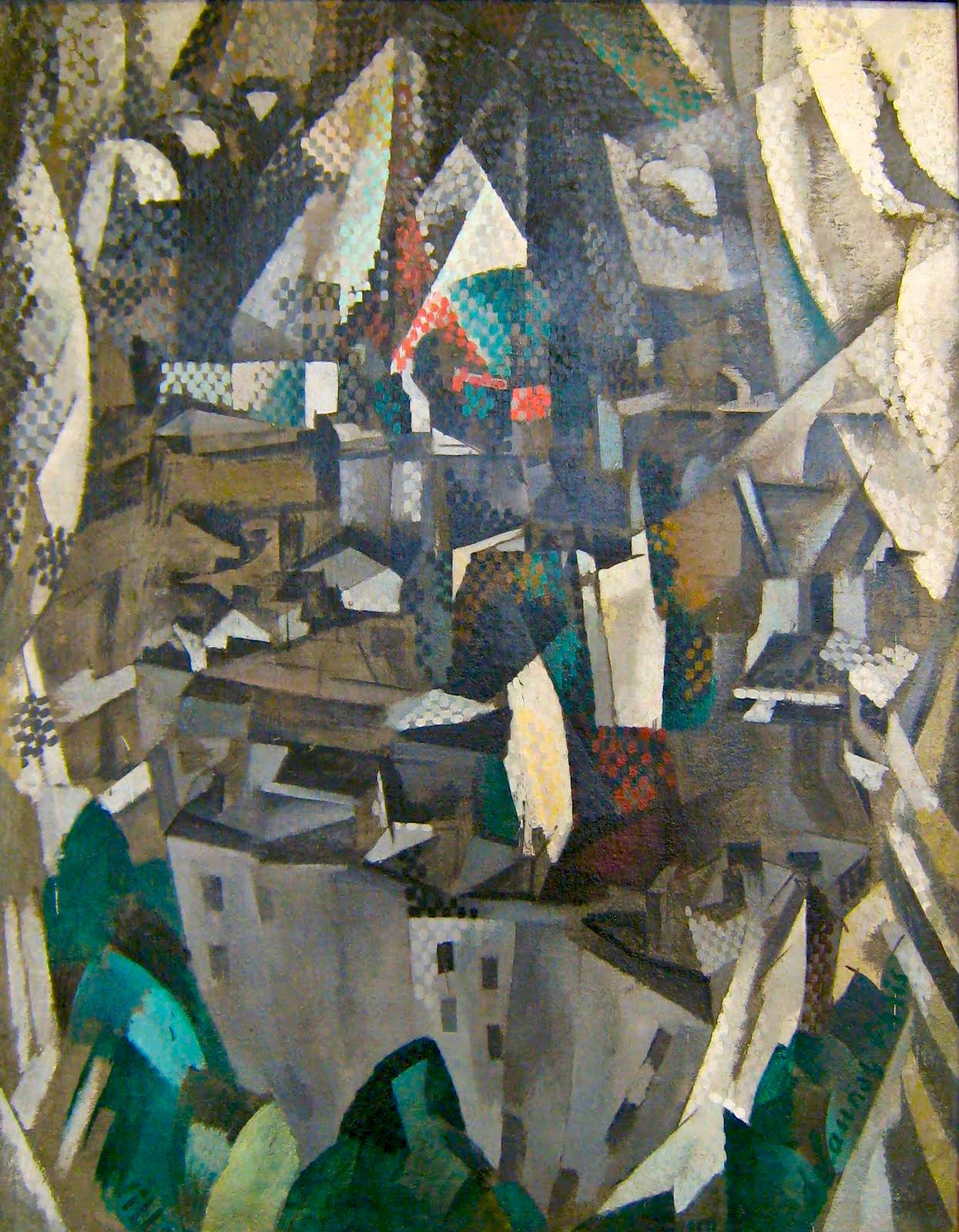
Robert Delaunay, 1910–11, La ville, no. 2, oil on canvas, 146 x 114 cm, Musée National d'Art Moderne, Centre Georges Pompidou, Paris

== See also ==
- List of paintings by Georges Seurat
