= Young Woman Powdering Herself (Seurat) =

Painting by Georges Seurat

- Jeune femme se poudrant (French)
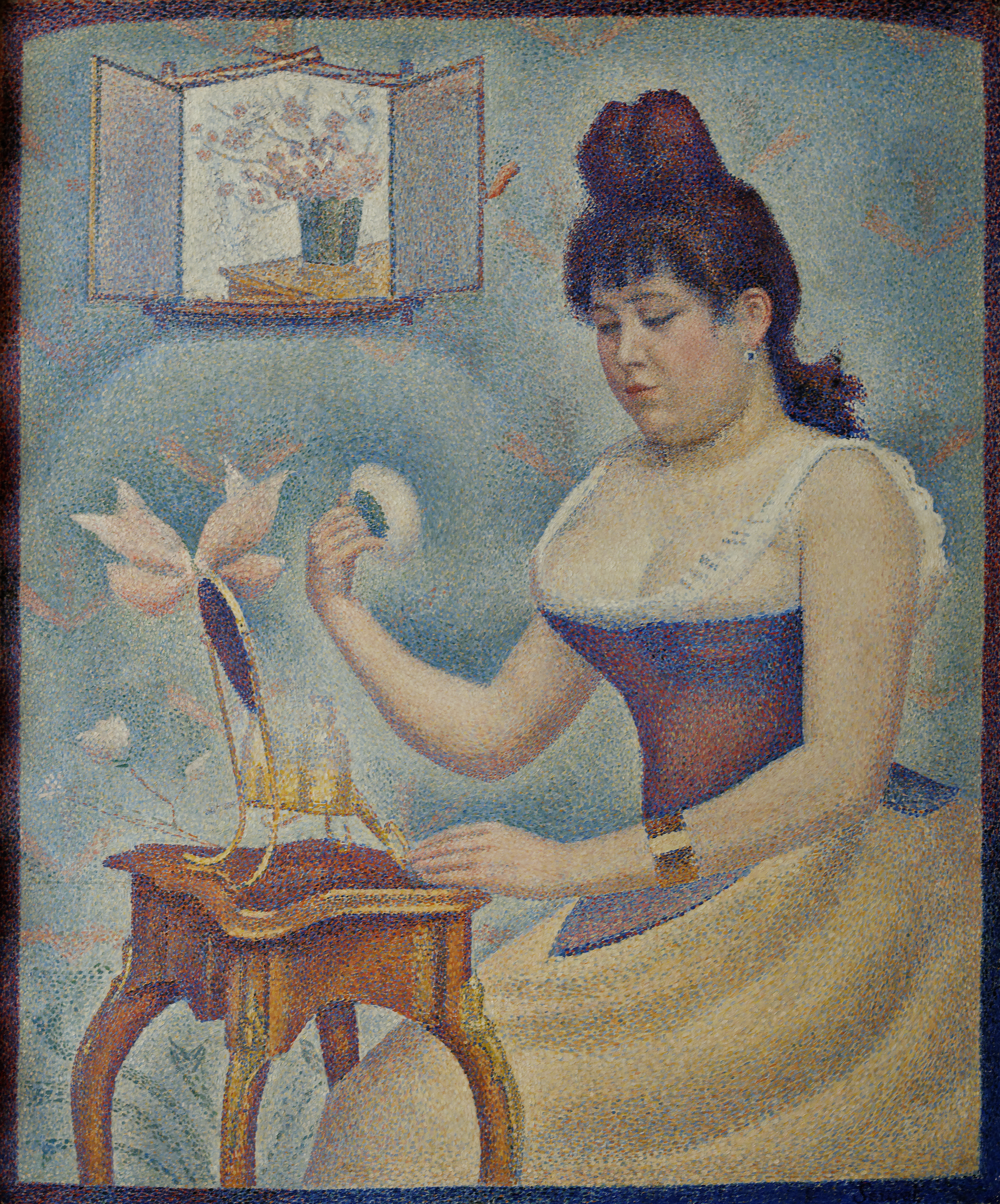
- Artist: Georges Seurat
- Year: 1889–90
- Medium: oil on canvas
- Dimensions: 95.5 by 79.5 centimetres (37.6 in × 31.3 in)
- Location: Courtauld Gallery, London

Young Woman Powdering Herself (French: Jeune femme se poudrant) is an oil on canvas painting executed between 1889 and 1890 by the French painter Georges Seurat. Considered a leading example of pointillism, it is Seurat’s only single-subject portrait and depicts his mistress, Madeleine Knobloch, sitting at her dressing table.

The painting has been the subject of various scholarly interpretations, including scholarship that emphasizes themes of artifice and human vanity. Decades after it was first displayed at the Sixth Salon des Indépendants in March 1890, modern scientific imagining revealed a hidden self-portrait of Seurat under the top layers of paint. As a result,Young Woman Powdering Herself is the only known self-portrait of Seurat.

Although the work received little critical attention at the time of its debut, it later garnered both praise and criticism from art critics. The painting has been owned by several notable art collectors before Samuel Courtauld bought it in 1926. Courtauld later donated it to the Courtauld Institute of Art, where it remains on display today in the Gallery at Somerset House.

== Background ==
Young Woman Powdering Herself is a portrait of Madeleine Knobloch, Seurat's mistress. Art historians believe Knobloch was pregnant with their son, Pierre-Georges Seurat, when this portrait was painted due to her larger size and fullness. Knobloch gave birth to Pierre-Georges Seurat one month before the 1890 exhibition of the painting. As a result of their relationship, Seurat’s family divided his artwork with Knobloch upon his death and gave her a pension.

The identification of Knobloch as the subject of the portrait was not confirmed until after Seurat's death in 1891. Despite the pension that Seurat's family provided her, Knobloch continued to send letters to Seurat’s friends asking for money. In these letters, she refers to Young Woman Powdering Herself as “mon portrait,” allowing art historians to identify her as the subject of the painting.

== Description and analysis ==
=== Subject matter ===
The composition centers on Madeleine Knobloch, seated in front of a small table. Her tight corset and full skirt accentuate her voluptuous figure, which most likely reflects her pregnancy.

Seurat also includes several objects that define the intimate setting. The table in front of Knobloch holds a small mirror with a pink bow tied to it, along with two perfume bottles. As the woman looks in the mirror, she uses a puff to apply powder to her face. Behind the woman is a flat wall covered in wallpaper, and in the top-left corner hangs a bamboo-edged mirror reflecting a flower vase on a table. The bamboo frame and folding doors of the mirror reveal Seurat's interest in japonisme.

=== Technique and interpretation ===
Seurat employs the pointillist method to construct Young Woman Powdering Herself. Using what he referred to as “my method,” he applies paint in small dots that blend together in an optical fusion of colors.

The meaning of Seurat's painting remains unclear, with different art historians offering various perspectives. One line of scholarship produced by the Courtauld Gallery argues that the painting explores the tension between the natural and the artificial. Proponents of this view note that the woman's cosmetics, such as powder and perfume, convey the idea of artifice because they contribute to her idealized appearance. This reading is reinforced by Seurat's flat composition, which presses Knobloch and her vanity against the wall, depicting a deliberately constructed setting rather than a naturalistic one.

A different interpretation, presented by Robert Herbert, frames the painting as a commentary on human vanity. From this perspective, the woman's focus on herself and her looks symbolize a concern with self-image. Further emphasizing this point, Herbert notes the woman's modest surroundings, which highlight the contrast between her careful attention to her appearance and the plain furniture around her.

== Hidden self-portrait ==
Young Woman Powdering Herself has long been rumored to contain a possible hidden self-portrait. Since the painting was publicly shown, the wall behind Knobloch displayed a mirror reflecting a vase of flowers. However, in 1931, art critic Robert Rey was the first to suggest that the painting may have a self-portrait concealed beneath the mirror. According to Rey, Seurat originally painted himself in the mirror, but decided to cover it up after his close friend told him that the placement of his portrait in the mirror “could be perceived as comical.” It remains unknown who his friend was.

To see if Rey was correct, X radiographs of the painting were conducted in 1958 and 1987. These scans uncovered a hidden coat of paint underneath the flower vase. While this discovery hinted at the existence of a self-portrait, curators of a 1991 Seurat exhibit at the Metropolitan Museum of Art in New York expressed skepticism about Rey’s anecdote.

Following advances in imaging technology, a multispectral scanner was used in 2014 to reveal a portrait of a man with a beard seated before a canvas. He holds a long stick in his hand, which is assumed to be a paintbrush. Since the portrait resembles Seurat's image, experts believe this scan verifies Rey’s anecdote. This concealed portrait is the only known self-portrait made by Seurat.

== Critical reception ==
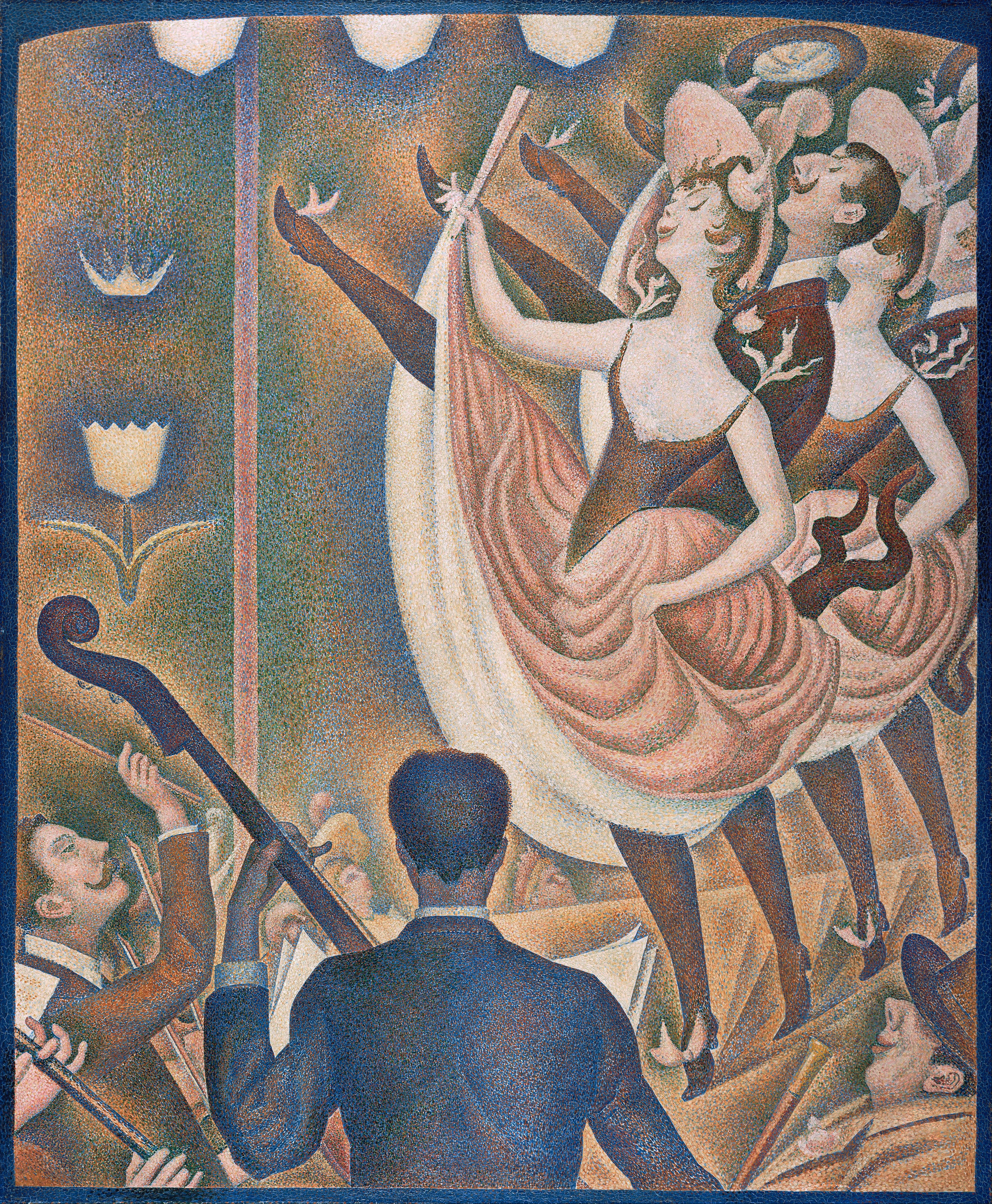
Le Chahut by Georges Seurat, 1889-90

When originally exhibited at the Sixth Salon des Indépendants in 1890, Young Woman Powdering Herself did not receive much attention. The painting was eclipsed by Seurat’s other entry, Le Chahut, which depicts a group of cancan dancers. Out of all of Seurat’s figural paintings, Young Woman Powdering Herself remains the least discussed.

Nonetheless, some critics have expressed strong admiration for the painting over the years. In 1890, Georges Lecomte wrote in L’Art Moderne that the painting was done “with a delightful workmanship and modeling.” In 1926, Roger Fry went further in his praise, complimenting Seurat for taking an “impossible woman in the grotesque deshabillé of the eighties” and treating her with “religious solemnity [that] carries it all into a region of abstract beauty.” Fry went on to state that this “complete transmutation of the scheme…is the test of great art.”

However, not all of the work's reception was positive. In 1900, Julien Leclercq of Chronique des Arts noted that “Seurat’s painting unfortunately lacks expression.” Leclercq proceeded to mention that Seurat “draws with precision but without character.”

== Ownership ==
The painting's ownership history began with Knobloch. Upon Seurat’s death in 1891, Madeleine Knobloch claimed Young Woman Powdering Herself as “[her] portrait.” Shortly after, she sold it to Félix Fénéon, a French critic and art dealer. After owning the painting for more than two decades, Dikran Kélékian, an antiques dealer, bought it from Fénéon. Kélékian later put it up for sale in January 1922. From this sale, art collector John Quinn bought the painting for 65,000 francs.

Following Quinn's death, the painting entered his estate and continued to circulate among major collectors. After much convincing, Henri-Pierre Roché successfully purchased Young Woman Powdering Herself, along with an unknown number of Seurat paintings and 52 Picasso paintings for his clients Paul Rosenberg and Félix Wildenstein. They eventually sent the painting to art dealer Henry Wallis, with Rosenberg underwriting “an insurance of 250,000 francs” for him to exhibit it.

Samuel Courtauld ultimately secured the painting for his collection. He attended Wallis’s exhibition where Young Woman Powdering Herself was displayed, but he did not initially buy it. Courtauld later changed his mind, acquiring the painting in October of 1926. He later donated the painting to the Courtauld Institute of Art, where it remains today.

== See also ==
- List of paintings by Georges Seurat
