= The Week: A History of the Unnatural Rhythms That Made Us Who We Are =

2021 book by David M. Henkin

- Cover
- Author: David M. Henkin
- Language: English
- Subject: Social history, Cultural history, History of time
- Genre: Nonfiction
- Publisher: Yale University Press
- Publication date: November 16, 2021
- Publication place: United States
- Media type: Hardcover, Paperback, E-book, Audiobook
- Pages: 288
- ISBN: 978-0-300-25732-8 (hardcover)

The Week: A History of the Unnatural Rhythms That Made Us Who We Are is a 2021 book by American historian David M. Henkin, published by Yale University Press. Henkin presents a social and cultural history of the seven-day week. He argues that the week, unlike the day, month, or year, has no astronomical basis and is an entirely artificial construct that became deeply embedded in American life through industrialization, weekly wage labor, mass schooling, and domestic routines. The book is based on archival sources including diaries, correspondence, housekeeping manuals, and courtroom testimony to demonstrate how Americans came to associate particular activities with specific weekdays. The final chapters of the book address the global spread of the seven-day week, failed calendar reform movements of the early twentieth century, the Soviet Union's brief experiments with alternative week lengths, and contemporary challenges to weekly consciousness posed by digital technology and the COVID-19 pandemic.

== Background ==
Henkin, a Professor of History (then the Margaret Byrne Professor of History) at the University of California, Berkeley, developed the book over more than a decade of archival research. In interviews, Henkin noted that historians of time had focused predominantly on the clock rather than the calendar, treating the hour as the primary symbol of modern time consciousness due to its association with mechanical technology, punctuality, and industrial discipline. The week, by contrast, had received comparatively little scholarly attention despite being, in Henkin's view, equally artificial and increasingly central to social organization in the modern world.

Henkin's research drew on two principal categories of sources. The first consisted of public documents including newspapers, city directories, theater schedules, school curricula, housekeeping guides, and records of voluntary associations, which revealed the extent to which recurring activities were organized around the seven-day cycle. The second and more extensive category comprised personal documents, particularly diaries, as well as correspondence, memoirs, and courtroom testimony, which allowed Henkin to examine not only what activities people undertook on particular days but how they remembered and sometimes failed to remember what day of the week it was.

Diary keeping, Henkin observed, became a mass practice in the United States during the early nineteenth century, driven by factors including mass education, commercial accounting practices, and Protestant traditions of self-examination. Pre-formatted pocket diaries, which had failed to attract buyers when introduced in the 1770s, became popular consumer goods by the 1820s. These typically arranged six or seven days across a two-page spread, conditioning users to conceptualize their lives in weekly rather than monthly units. To ensure geographical and social diversity in his sample, Henkin consulted manuscript collections in New England, North Carolina, Tennessee, Chicago, and Oregon, and examined diaries from a range of demographic groups including soldiers, schoolgirls, farmers, and middle-class men engaged in commercial occupations.

A key methodological approach involved identifying errors and corrections in diary entries. Henkin found that when diarists made mistakes aligning the day of the week with the calendar date, they overwhelmingly erred on the date while recording the day correctly, suggesting that weekly consciousness had become more deeply embedded than numerical date-keeping. Instances where diarists lost track of the day typically occurred when individuals were removed from their regular routines through travel, illness, or vacation.

== Argument ==
Henkin treats the seven-day week as a social and cultural institution, focusing primarily on the nineteenth-century United States. Unlike years, months, and days, which have astronomical foundations, the week is an entirely historical and social construct with no scientific basis. The study argues that the early American republic was an unusually week-oriented society, in part because American colonists abandoned most of the annual feast days common in Europe, leaving the weekly Sabbath (or Lord's day) as the primary calendrical anchor. The influence of Puritan settlers, who rejected the Church of England's abundance of saints' days as redolent of Catholicism, contributed to this dominical orientation. Through industrialization, urbanization, and mass education during the nineteenth century, weekly consciousness became increasingly entrenched in American life.

He identifies several factors that strengthened Americans' associations between specific weekdays and particular activities. Weekly wage payments, which became more common during the antebellum period, tightened the relationship between money and time; workers paid on Saturdays often spent much of their earnings quickly, creating what one passage describes as a financial hourglass pattern across the week. Standardized housework routines assigned specific tasks to particular days, with Monday widely recognized as washing day. Common schools organized curricula around weekly schedules, and the growth of voluntary associations encouraged Americans to arrange recurring meetings by the week. The publication schedules of newspapers and magazines also reinforced weekly consciousness among readers.

A substantial portion of the research is based on nineteenth-century diaries, correspondence, and courtroom testimony to illustrate how ordinary Americans internalized weekly rhythms. The shift from almanacs, which organized dates by month, to preformatted diary books structured by the week reflected and reinforced changing temporal habits. The book examines diverse subjects including freed slaves, physicians, and children from elite families to demonstrate the breadth of weekly consciousness across social groups. Instances of losing track of weekdays, whether through overland travel, confinement, or illness, reveal how social cues such as mail schedules and church bells helped Americans maintain their temporal bearings.

In the final chapter, Henkin traces the global spread of the seven-day week in the late nineteenth century and the subsequent calendar reform movements that sought to rationalize the relationship between weeks and the solar year. Proposals such as the International Fixed Calendar and the World Calendar, which included days outside the seven-day count, reached the League of Nations in 1931 and won support from major American corporations including Kodak. These reforms ultimately failed, though the precise reasons remain subject to interpretation. The book attributes the failure primarily to religious opposition from groups committed to preserving an unbroken Sabbath count. The Soviet Union's experiments with five-day and six-day weeks during the 1930s similarly collapsed, in part due to the loss of social coordination when family members received different days off. In the epilogue, Henkin considers contemporary challenges to weekly consciousness, including digital technology, asynchronous commerce, and the widespread temporal disorientation experienced during the COVID-19 pandemic, sometimes called "Blursday."

== Reviews ==
Benjamin Hunnicutt praised the work for employing what he called "history's sledgehammer to shatter yet another 'bedrock reality.'" Hunnicutt found that the study provided important new insights beyond earlier scholarship on the week, particularly through its research on nineteenth-century America. He highlighted the book's treatment of how the week came to shape "modern time consciousness" through industrial work discipline, expanding leisure activities, and public schooling. Hunnicutt believed that such "relativizing histories" serve as valuable safeguards against hubris by exposing the contingency of seemingly permanent institutions.

Writing from an anthropological perspective, Kevin K. Birth found the discussion of diary keeping and the emergence of weekly social habits persuasive. Birth situated the work within a small body of literature on the week and commended its focus on social, educational, and commercial rhythms rather than emphasizing Jewish tradition. He raised one objection to the argument, however, contending that the book's conclusion about calendar reform failing due to the week's religious origins "underestimates the power of the social habits this book nicely documents."

Anthony Grafton's lengthy review in the London Review of Books situated the book within broader patterns of American timekeeping and religious practice. Grafton noted that while the New England Sabbath developed a reputation for particular strictness, weekly observance spread unevenly across the expanding country: Quaker Philadelphia enforced restrictions that infuriated the travel writer Frances Trollope, and many plantations followed a six-day work week despite forced Sunday labor remaining common in the deep South during harvest time. Grafton credited the book's discussion of Benjamin Franklin's chart of thirteen virtues, tracked across seven days, with illuminating the origins of the nineteenth-century American vogue for diary keeping and self-improvement. He found persuasive the argument that the commercial revolution enforced attention to the week, with Saturday wages enabling workers to redeem their Sunday clothes from pawnshops, and that prescriptive literature ordained domestic labor "must also follow a weekly rhythm," making the week "a management tool of undisputed utility." Grafton was particularly struck by the evidence that pocket diaries trained Americans to track weekdays, with the names of days appearing more frequently and accurately in journals than calendar dates, and witnesses in court proving more confident when using weekdays to mark testimony than when giving exact dates. He observed, however, that the tight focus on the week necessarily excluded other ways Americans mapped time, including the "magnificently strange illustrated timelines" depicting linear historical progress, and that complex thinkers treated in the book "don't have a chance to tell us everything they know about his larger subject, the individual's manifold experiences of time." Grafton thought that this approach "comes at a price, though one very much worth paying," leaving room for further scholarship on how Americans have lived in and with time.

Benjamin Schneider offered a more critical assessment from an economic history perspective. Schneider thought that "readers looking for quantitative support for the book's claims will occasionally be disappointed." He found the treatment of regularized household work persuasive but questioned assertions about the prevalence of weekly wage payments and cyclical spending patterns, arguing these claims required stronger evidentiary support. Schneider nonetheless concluded that the work "persuasively demonstrates the importance of hebdomadal cycles in social and cultural life" and proposed several hypotheses worthy of further investigation.

Doug Girardot praised the granular archival research into how ordinary nineteenth-century Americans conceptualized time while criticizing the book's argumentation as unclear and meandering. Girardot suggested that the evidence marshaled from diaries and documentary ephemera "only vaguely suggests" the thesis, with the argument at times "drowned in a morass of quotations and biographical anecdotes." He thought that while the author deserved credit for reintroducing the topic to mainstream historical conversation, "his exhaustive research is still not enough to remove the enigmatic shroud from the week."
