= Free Time: The Forgotten American Dream =

2013 book

Free Time
- First edition
- Author: Benjamin Kline Hunnicutt
- Cover artist: Georges Seurat, Study for "A Sunday Afternoon on the Island of La Grande Jatte", 1884,
- Subject: Labor history, American studies
- Publisher: Temple University Press
- Publication date: January 2013
- Pages: 250
- ISBN: 978-1-4399-0714-6

Free Time: The Forgotten American Dream is a 2013 book by Benjamin Kline Hunnicutt on the connection between the American Dream and American leisure time.

== Bibliography ==
- Alpuerto-Abadam, Vidalina (2014). "No time to play in the USA?". Monthly Labor Review. ISSN 0098-1818. JSTOR monthlylaborrev.2014.09.017.
- McBee, Randy D. (2013). "Review of Free Time: The Forgotten American Dream". The American Historical Review. 118 (5): 1563–1564. ISSN 0002-8762. JSTOR 23784675.
- McCrossen, Alexis Macon (2014). "Review of Free Time: The Forgotten American Dream". The Journal of American History. 100 (4): 1176–1177. ISSN 0021-8723. JSTOR 44307866.
- Ramey, Valerie A. (2013). "Review of Free Time: The Forgotten American Dream". The Journal of Economic History. 73 (4): 1190–1191. ISSN 0022-0507. JSTOR 24551029.
