= Mystery and Melancholy of a Street =

Painting by Giorgio de Chirico

- Artist: Giorgio de Chirico
- Year: 1914
- Medium: Oil on canvas
- Dimensions: 87.5 cm × 71.5 cm (34.4 in × 28.1 in)
- Location: Private collection

Mystery and Melancholy of a Street is a 1914 oil-on-canvas painting by the Italian artist Giorgio de Chirico. It is held in a private collection.

== Description ==
The painting depicts a street which is framed by two long, white buildings with arcades. The shadows shown are sharp, as if lit by the Mediterranean sun, and they divide the painting into two parts: on the left, the façade of the building is completely lit; on the right, the building is plunged into shadow and it extends over the lower part of the painting. The ground of the street is yellow, while the sky is blue-green. They meet at the horizon, materialized in a small space visible between the two buildings, towards the upper third of the painting.

In the lower left, in full sunlight, but only represented by a dark silhouette, a young girl walks up the street spinning a hoop. Towards the top of the street, a human form, which is probably a statue, is obscured by the building on the right, and only its shadow is visible on the ground. In the lower right half, in the shadow of the building on the right, there is an empty train car, with its doors open.

The perspectives of the different elements of the painting are mutually contradictory: if the vanishing point of the building on the left defines the horizon, that of the building on the right seems to be located towards the middle of the painting. The wagon is represented in an isometric perspective. According to James T. Soby, "the geometry has been deliberately modified for the purposes of poetic suggestion".

== History ==
De Chirico painted Mystery and Melancholy of a Street, in 1914, when he was living in Paris. The painting was made during the "metaphysical" period of his work (around 1909-1919). Several paintings from this time contain similar elements. In particular, de Chirico was influenced by the architecture of Turin and Florence, whose "metaphysical character" he perceived due to their spatial arrangement. The arcades are likely to hide secrets; the strong contrasts between shadows and light underline the enigmatic absence of human beings, as if trapped in narrow, inaccessible places.

Art critics have emphasized the seemingly threatening nature of the shadow of the human form that comes out of frame and towards the girl. It is not possible to know to whom it belongs. However, by comparison with other paintings of the same period, it can be assumed that it is the shadow of a statue rather than of a human being.

The wagon also appears in another painting by Chirico, The Anguish of Departure, made in 1914, where it is depicted as completely enclosed.

The enigmatic girl with the hoop is not found anywhere else in de Chirico's work. According to James T. Soby, he may have been influenced by a girl depicted in Georges Seurat's painting A Sunday Afternoon on the Island of La Grande Jatte (1886).

De Chirico returned to the theme around 1925 with a visually similar painting, preserved at the Hamburger Kunsthalle. He made a new version around 1960 (backdated to 1948), entitled Mystery and Melancholy of a Street, Girl with Hoop. The arcades of the building on the left are smaller, while the shadow cast by the invisible figure has no hands, the wagon has no wheels, and luggage is seen scattered around.
