= Île de la Jatte =

Island in Hauts-de-Seine, France

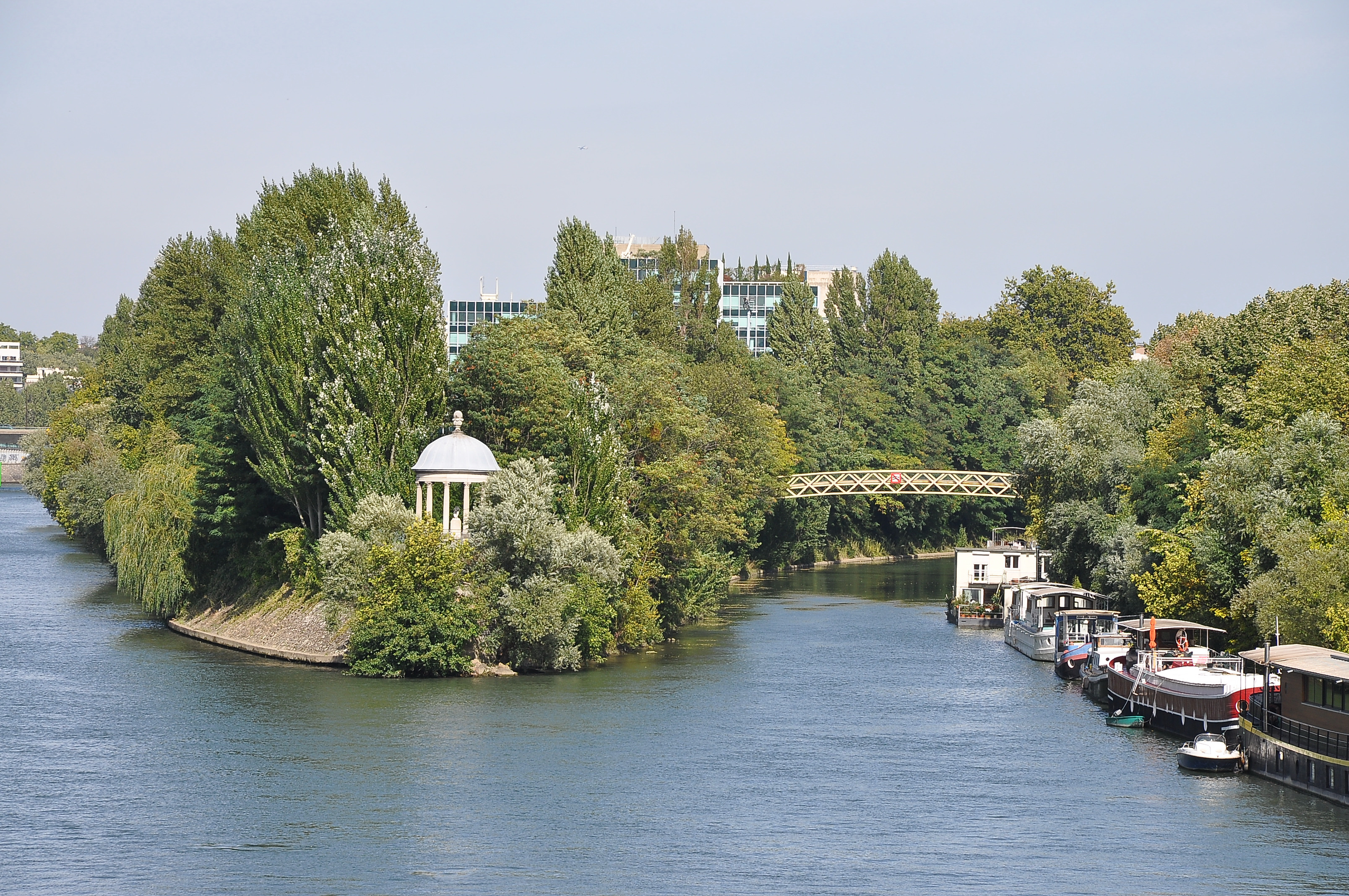
- View of La Grande Jatte Island from Neuilly Bridge (with the Temple de l'Amour (Neuilly-sur-Seine)

- Location within Paris

Geography
- Location: Seine
- Coordinates: 48°53′44″N 2°16′7″E

Administration
- France

The Île de la Jatte (French pronunciation: [il də la ʒat]) or Île de la Grande Jatte ([- ɡʁɑ̃d ʒat]) is an island in the river Seine, located in the department of Hauts-de-Seine, and shared between the two communes of Neuilly-sur-Seine and Levallois. It is situated at the very gates of Paris, being 7 km distant (in a straight line) from the towers of Notre Dame and 3 km from the Place de l'Étoile. The island, which has about 4,000 inhabitants, is nearly 2 km long and almost 200 m wide at its widest point. Its name translates as "Island of the Bowl" or "Island of the Big Bowl".

It is best known as the setting for Georges Seurat's pointillist oil painting A Sunday Afternoon on the Island of La Grande Jatte (1884–1886), itself the inspiration for the musical Sunday in the Park with George (1984).

Pont de Levallois–Bécon Métro station lies close to the north-eastern end of the island.

== History ==
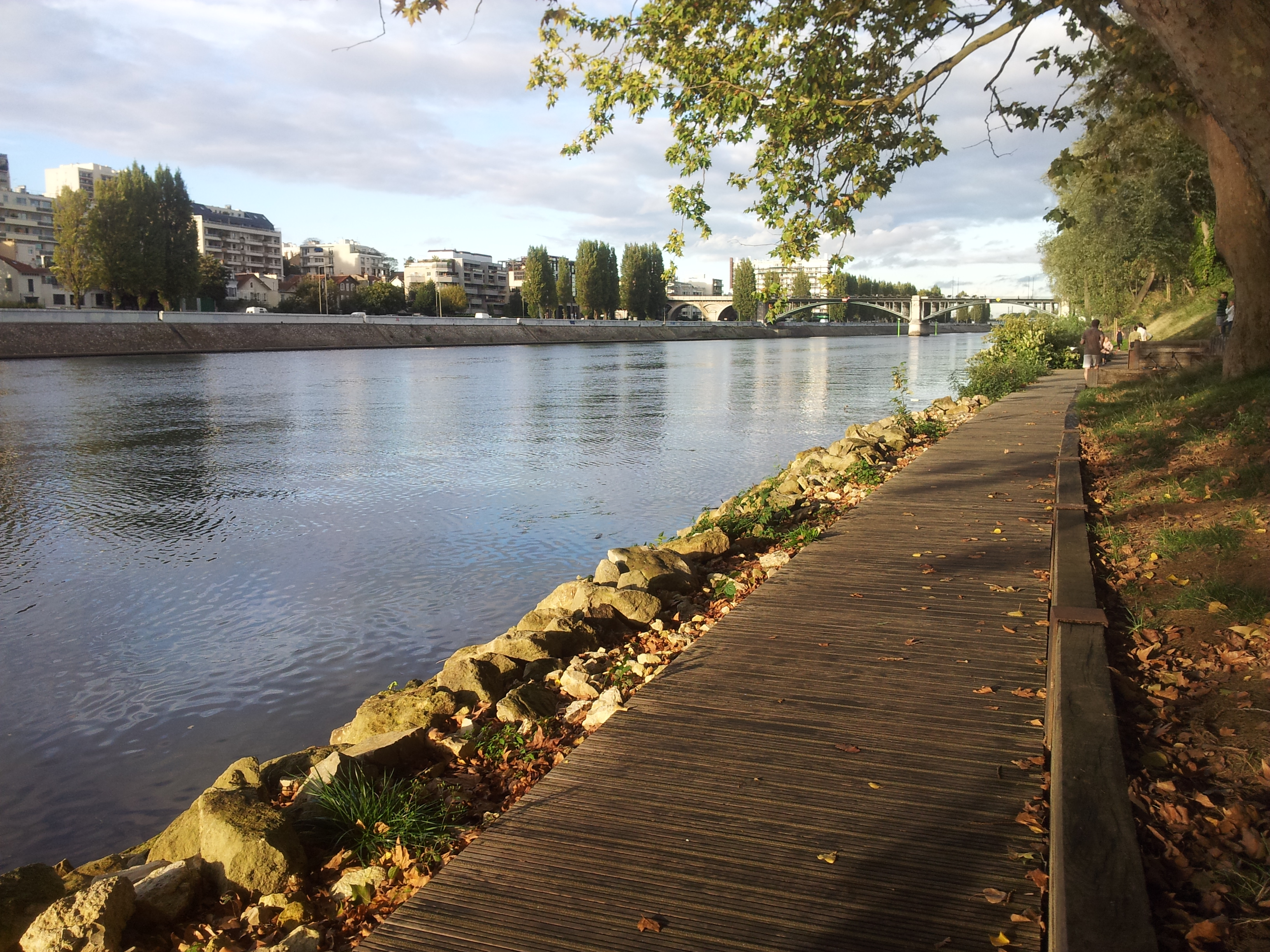
La Grande Jatte in 2011

In 1818, the Duke of Orléans, Louis-Philippe, acquired the Château de Neuilly to house his family of ten children. He bought the land and created a park which included the island, reachable only by boat. He also moved the Temple de Mars ('Temple of Mars'), which his father had commissioned, from Parc Monceau, and put it on the northern point of the island, converting it into the Temple de l’amour ('Temple of Love'). It was moved to the southern end of the island in 1930.

Between 1850 and 1870, Napoléon III and Baron Haussmann further modified the island, and artists began painting there. At the end of the 19th century the island became known for its painters, especially the Impressionists. In addition to Georges Seurat, artists such as Claude Monet, Vincent van Gogh, Alfred Sisley, Charles Angrand, and Albert Gleizes painted scenes of the island.

In June 2009, a walk around the island was established, detailing the works of the Impressionists.

== Artistic portrayal ==
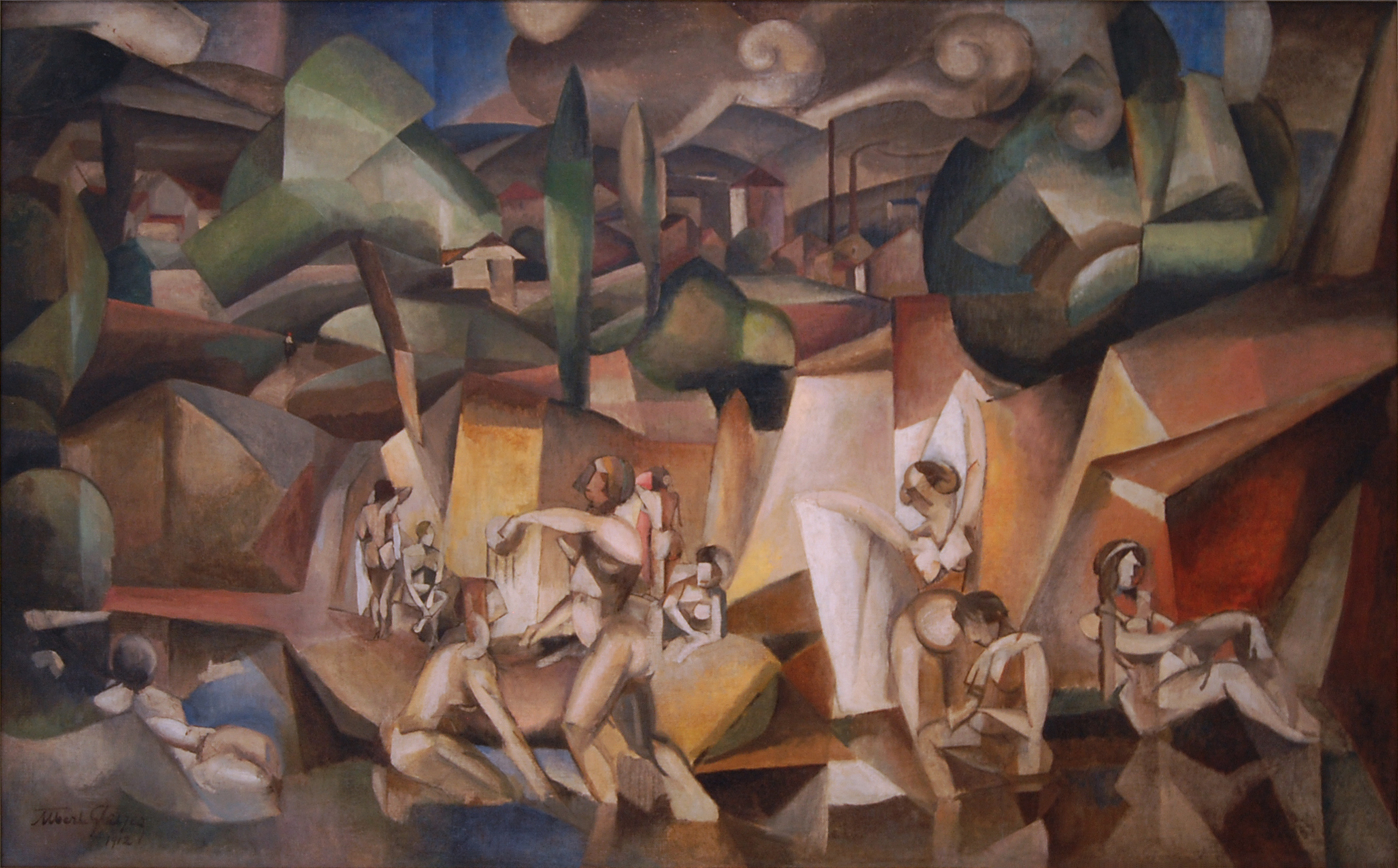
Albert Gleizes, 1912, Les Baigneuses (The Bathers), Musée d'Art Moderne de la Ville de Paris

Georges Seurat's A Sunday Afternoon on the Island of La Grande Jatte, 1884-1886

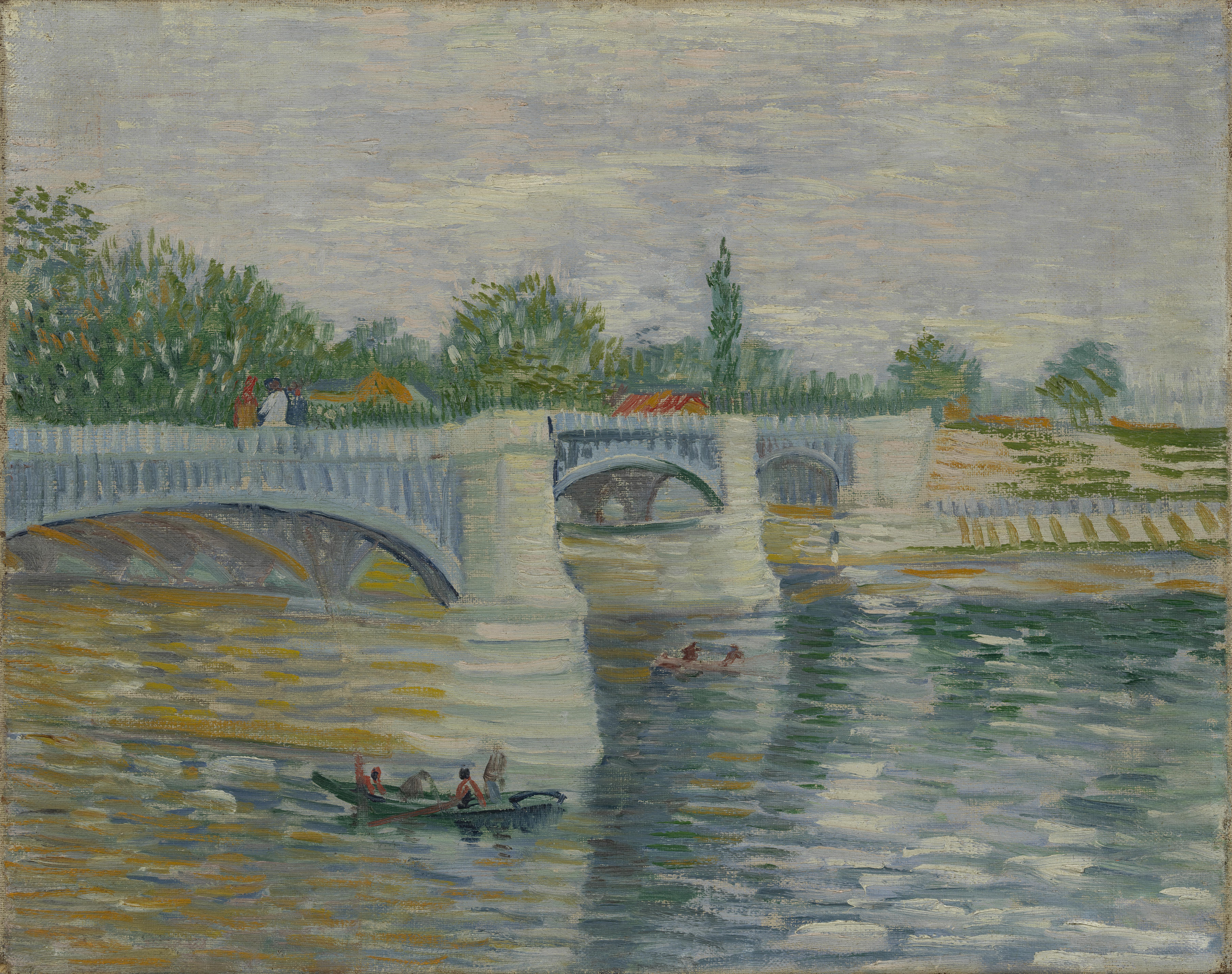
Vincent van Gogh, La Seine et le pont de la Grande Jatte, 1887

Many artists have painted L’Île de la Grande Jatte:

- Émile Bernard
  - Le Pont de fer d’Asnières, 1887, oil on canvas, 45.9 × 54.2 cm, Museum of Modern Art
- Pierre Bonnard
  - Les travailleurs à la Grande Jatte, c. 1916–1920, oil on canvas, 130 x 160 cm, National Museum of Western Art
- Albert Gleizes
  - Les Baigneuses (The Bathers), 1912, oil on canvas, 105 x 171 cm, Musée d'Art Moderne de la Ville de Paris
  - L’Île de la Grande Jatte ou Bord de parc avec rivière animée de canots, 1907–1909, pastel and ink on paper, 25 × 41.5 cm, private collection
  - L’Île de la Grande Jatte, 1908, charcoal and gouache on paper, 25 × 41.5 cm, Musée National d'Art Moderne
  - La Seine près de Courbevoie, 1908, oil on canvas, 54 × 65 cm, Musée Roybet Fould
- Claude Monet
  - L’île de la Grande Jatte, 1874, oil on canvas, 50 × 70 cm, private collection
  - À travers les arbres, île de la Grande Jatte, 1878, oil on canvas, 54 × 65 cm, private collection
  - Les rives de la Seine, île de la Grande Jatte, 1878, oil on canvas, 52 × 63 cm, Musée Marmottan
  - Printemps à l'Île de la Grande Jatte, 1878, oil on canvas, 50 × 61 cm, National Gallery (Norway)
- Alexandre Nozal
  - L’Embâcle de la Seine entre Asnières et Courbevoie, 1891, pastel and graphite on canvas, 51 × 90 cm, Petit Palais
- Georges Seurat
  - Baignade à Asnières, 1884, oil on canvas, 201 × 300 cm, National Gallery
  - La Seine à Courbevoie ou Paysage à la tourelle, 1884, oil on canvas, 15.5 × 24.5 cm, Van Gogh Museum
  - Un dimanche après-midi à l'Île de la Grande Jatte, 1884–1886, oil on canvas, 207.5 × 308.1 cm, Art Institute of Chicago
  - Temps gris, Grande-Jatte, 1886, oil on canvas, 70.5 × 86.4 cm, Metropolitan Museum of Art
  - Le Pont de Courbevoie, 1886–87, oil on canvas 46.4 × 55.3 cm, Courtauld Gallery
  - La Seine à la Grande Jatte, 1888, oil on canvas, 65 × 81 cm, Royal Museums of Fine Arts of Belgium
- Alfred Sisley
  - L’Île de la Grande Jatte, 1873, oil on canvas, 50 × 65 cm, Musée d'Orsay
- Vincent van Gogh
  - La Seine et le pont de la Grande Jatte, 1887, oil on canvas, 32 × 40.5 cm, Van Gogh Museum

== Celebrities who have lived on the island ==
The following celebrities are known to have lived on the island:

- Richard Branson, business magnate, investor, and philanthropist.
- Christian Clavier, actor.
- Alexander Grothendieck, mathematician.
- Patricia Kaas, singer.
- Jean Reno, actor.
- Yves Rénier, actor.
- Nicolas Sarkozy, politician, 23rd President of France.
- Alessandra Sublet, radio and television host.
- Marco Verratti, football (soccer) player.
- Victor Wembanyama, basketball player.
