= Kellogg's Six-Hour Day =

1996 book

- Author: Benjamin Kline Hunnicutt
- Subject: Labor history
- Publisher: Temple University Press
- Publication date: 1996
- Pages: 288
- ISBN: 978-1-56639-448-2

Kellogg's Six-Hour Day is a 1996 book by Benjamin Kline Hunnicutt on the implementation and effects of a reduced work week policy at Kellogg's.
