= Work Without End =

1988 book

- Author: Benjamin Kline Hunnicutt
- Subject: Labor history, American studies
- Publisher: Temple University Press
- Publication date: May 1988
- Pages: 416
- ISBN: 978-0-87722-520-1

Work Without End: Abandoning Shorter Hours for the Right to Work is a 1988 book by Benjamin Kline Hunnicutt on the rise and decline of American leisure time.

== Bibliography ==
- Butsch, Richard (1990). "Review of Work without End: Abandoning Shorter Hours for the Right to Work". International Labor and Working-Class History (37): 115–117. ISSN 0147-5479. JSTOR 27671878.
- Cross, Gary (1989). "Review of Work without End: Abandoning Shorter Hours for the Right to Work". The Business History Review. 63 (3): 672–674. doi:10.2307/3116050. ISSN 0007-6805. JSTOR 3116050.
- Friedman, Gerald (1989). "Review of Work without End: Abandoning Shorter Hours for the Right to Work". The Annals of the American Academy of Political and Social Science. 505: 190–192. ISSN 0002-7162. JSTOR 1047312.
- Lichtenstein, Nelson (January 29, 1989). "The Death of the Six-Hour Day". The New York Times. ISSN 0362-4331.
- Keyssar, Alexander (1990). "Review of Work without End: Abandoning Shorter Hours for the Right to Work". The American Historical Review. 95 (2): 611–612. doi:10.2307/2163975. ISSN 0002-8762. JSTOR 2163975.
- Roediger, David (1989). "Review of Work without End: Abandoning Shorter Hours for the Right to Work". The Journal of American History. 76 (1): 290–291. doi:10.2307/1908450. ISSN 0021-8723. JSTOR 1908450.
- Whaples, Robert (1989). "Review of Work Without End: Abandoning Shorter Hours for the Right to Work". The Journal of Economic History. 49 (1): 241–243. ISSN 0022-0507. JSTOR 2121457.
