= Benjamin Kline Hunnicutt =

American historian

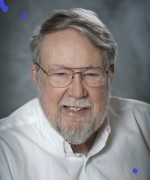
- Hunnicutt in 2019
- Born: Raleigh, North Carolina
- Spouse: Francine M.

Benjamin Kline Hunnicutt, Sr., is a historian. He has been a professor at the University of Iowa since 1975.

For most of his academic career, he has focused his research and writing on the historical mystery: "the end of shorter hours,” asking why after over a century of steady work reductions, during which work hours were cut nearly in half, shorter hours were considered an essential part of human progress, and most people (including John Maynard Keynes) expected the process to continue, did working hours stop getting shorter and the dream of increasing free time disappear?

With writers such as Joseph Pieper and Hannah Arendt, he has also explored the concept of the “rise of the world of total work”, which examines the increasing emphasis on work in modern society.

He is the author of numerous articles, book chapters, and books, including Work Without End: Abandoning Shorter Hours for the Right to Work (1987, Temple, see NY Times book review, Washington Post review); Kellogg's Six-Hour Day (1995, Temple, see NY Times book review) Free Time: The Forgotten American Dream (2013, Temple, see short review, NY Times), The Age of Experiences: Harnessing happiness to Build a New Economy (Temple, 2020, Foreword by Joe Pine).

Hunnicutt is a member of the Academy of Leisure Sciences and past co-director of the Society for the Reduction of Human Labor. Professor Hunnicutt received his MA and PhD in American History from the University of North Carolina, Chapel Hill. He has served as chair of Leisure Studies and head of the Division of Physical Education at the University of Iowa. He has worked as a consultant to unions and businesses interested in shorter work hours and the potential of leisure to improve the community and workplace.

Hunnicutt has written for The Wall Street Journal, Politico, Salon, and the Huffington Post, and appeared in a variety of nationally and internationally broadcast television and radio programs including: ABC News, NBC News, PBS, the Canadian and British Broadcasting Corporations, the Today Show, the Charlie Rose Show, and appeared in the PBS special, “Running Out of Time” and the German documentary, “Frohes Schaffen - Ein Film zur Senkung der Arbeitsmoral”.

Recent international interest in alternative work schedules (4-day, and thirty-hour weeks), has renewed and broadened interest in his work – see Salon.

See also the profile article about his scholarship and career, published by the Chronicle of Higher Education, Oct 20, 2014.

== Works ==
- Work Without End: Abandoning Shorter Hours for the Right to Work (1988)
- Kellogg's Six-Hour Day (1996)
- Free Time: The Forgotten American Dream (2013)
- The Age of Experiences: Harnessing Happiness to Build a New Economy (2020)
