= David M. Henkin =

American academic

- Occupations: Academic author

Academic background
- Education: B.A., Philosophy and History; M.A., History; PhD, History
- Alma mater: Yale University; University of California, Berkeley

David M. Henkin is an American historian, academic, and author. He is a professor in the Department of History at the University of California, Berkeley.

Henkin's research centers on ordinary life and popular culture in the United States during the 19th century. He received the 2007 Rita Lloyd Moroney Award from the United States Postal Service for his contributions to postal history.

== Education ==
Henkin earned his B.A., summa cum laude, in Philosophy and History from Yale University in 1987. He later received his M.A. (1992) and PhD (1995) in history from the University of California, Berkeley.

== Career ==
Henkin joined the University of California, Berkeley in 1997 as an assistant professor of history. He was promoted to associate professor in 2003, full professor in 2008, and was named the Margaret Byrne Professor of History in 2019. From 1995 to 1997, he served as a visiting assistant professor of history at Stanford University, where he also held a Mellon Postdoctoral Fellowship.

== Works ==
Henkin has authored multiple books, including City Reading: Written Words and Public Spaces in Antebellum New York, The Postal Age: The Emergence of Modern Communications in Nineteenth-Century America, and The Week: A History of the Unnatural Rhythms that Made Us Who We Are, wherein he studied very basic yet overlooked frameworks of everyday life, such as public reading, the postal system, and the seven-day week. Historian Anthony Grafton, reviewing Henkin's books, described him as "an archaeologist of the networks of daily life" and noted that his works are "full of ideas and stuffed with curious matter," raising questions without always answering them.

City Reading received generally positive reviews. Wayne A. Wiegand described it as a "well-written and solidly researched book" that "brings attention to a kind of reading matter heretofore little noticed by historians." Ann Fabian praised the book as a "contribution to the history of authority," noting that Henkin's success "is a tribute to his ingenuity as a cultural historian," though she found that "he sometimes argues at a level of abstraction not fully justified by his evidence" and that the work included "very little" about those "who lived and worked in early nineteenth-century New York." Charles Johanningsmeier observed that Henkin incorporated a "number of fantastic details" and that "each chapter convincingly recreates the contexts." However, he noted that the author had an "over-zealous" tendency in his arguments. Similarly, Scott E. Casper described the work as a "clever, brisk, theoretically sophisticated analysis," with "fascinating readings of the vehicles," adding that "much of this book's appeal stems from Henkin's ingenuity." However, he questioned whether there was sufficient evidence that New Yorkers "read urban texts in the manner he claims," asking, "should we read that familiarity onto antebellum New York?"

Henkin's book Postal Age was reviewed by Konstantin Dierks who highlighted that the book "effectively advances a theory of revolutionary historical change." He further described it as a "marvelous book" and stated that it is "thoroughly refreshing" to read a book with a variety of "subtle and sophisticated insights." However, he also remarked that it would have been "helpful" if he "fleshed out the international comparison to the British case in particular." Robert MacDougall characterized it as a "thoughtful and well-crafted history" of "postal culture." He noted that the book incorporates "extremely valuable" analysis and "Henkin performs a remarkable and imaginative reading of one ubiquitous sort of text." David Quigley praised it by calling its framework "most provocative" and categorized its readings as "convincing." He further elaborated that this book "opens onto a wide range of nineteenth-century American events and cultural practices" and mentioned that "in Henkin's account, it's never quite clear" who or what is "driving the process of cultural transformation that explodes across the continent between the Gold Rush and the Civil War."

Henkin's The Week: A History of the Unnatural Rhythms That Made Us Who We Are attracted scholarly and media interest for its exploration of the origins of the seven-day week. Melissa Holbrook Pierson, writing for Wall Street Journal, noted that Henkin "gives full throat to how" the seven-day system was formed. She further noted that "he establishes the historical pressures that rendered the organization of the week malleable to changing needs of the marketplace, prevailing religions, social custom, and the shape of working life." The book was also reviewed by J Borchert, who said that the book fills a "vacuum left by historians."

Henkin also co-authored a multi-editioned book, Becoming America: A History for the 21st Century, in which he and Rebecca McLennan incorporate contemporary scholarship by integrating popular culture, religion, technology, and environmental change into the narrative of American history.

== Awards and honors ==
- 2007 – Rita Lloyd Moroney Award, U.S. Postal Service
- 2007–2008 – Distinguished Teaching Award for Social Sciences, University of California, Berkeley
- 2015 – Faculty Award for Outstanding Mentorship of GSIs, University of California, Berkeley

== Books ==
- Henkin, David M (1998). City Reading: Written Words and Public Spaces in Antebellum New York. Columbia University Press. ISBN 9780231107457.
- Henkin, David M (2008). Postal Age: The Emergence of Modern Communications in Antebellum America. University of Chicago Press. ISBN 9780226327228.
- Henkin, David M; McLennan, Rebecca M. (2015). Becoming America: A History for the 21st Century. McGraw-Hill. ISBN 9780077800710.
- Henkin, David M (2021). The Week: A History of the Unnatural Rhythms That Made Us Who We Are. Yale University Press. ISBN 9780300263060.
