= A Sunday Afternoon on the Island of La Grande Jatte =

Painting by Georges Seurat

- Un dimanche après-midi à l'Île de la Grande Jatte (French)
- Artist: Georges Seurat
- Year: 1884–1886
- Medium: Oil on canvas
- Subject: People relaxing at Île de la Jatte in Paris
- Dimensions: 207.6 cm × 308 cm (81.7 in × 121.25 in)
- Location: Art Institute of Chicago, Chicago

A Sunday Afternoon on the Island of La Grande Jatte (French: Un dimanche après-midi à l'Île de la Grande Jatte) was painted from 1884 to 1886 and is Georges Seurat's most famous work. It is recognised as a leading example of pointillist technique and as a founding work of the neo-impressionist movement.

Seurat's composition, painted on a large canvas, includes a number of Parisians at a park on the banks of the River Seine. It is held in the collection of the Art Institute of Chicago.

== Background ==
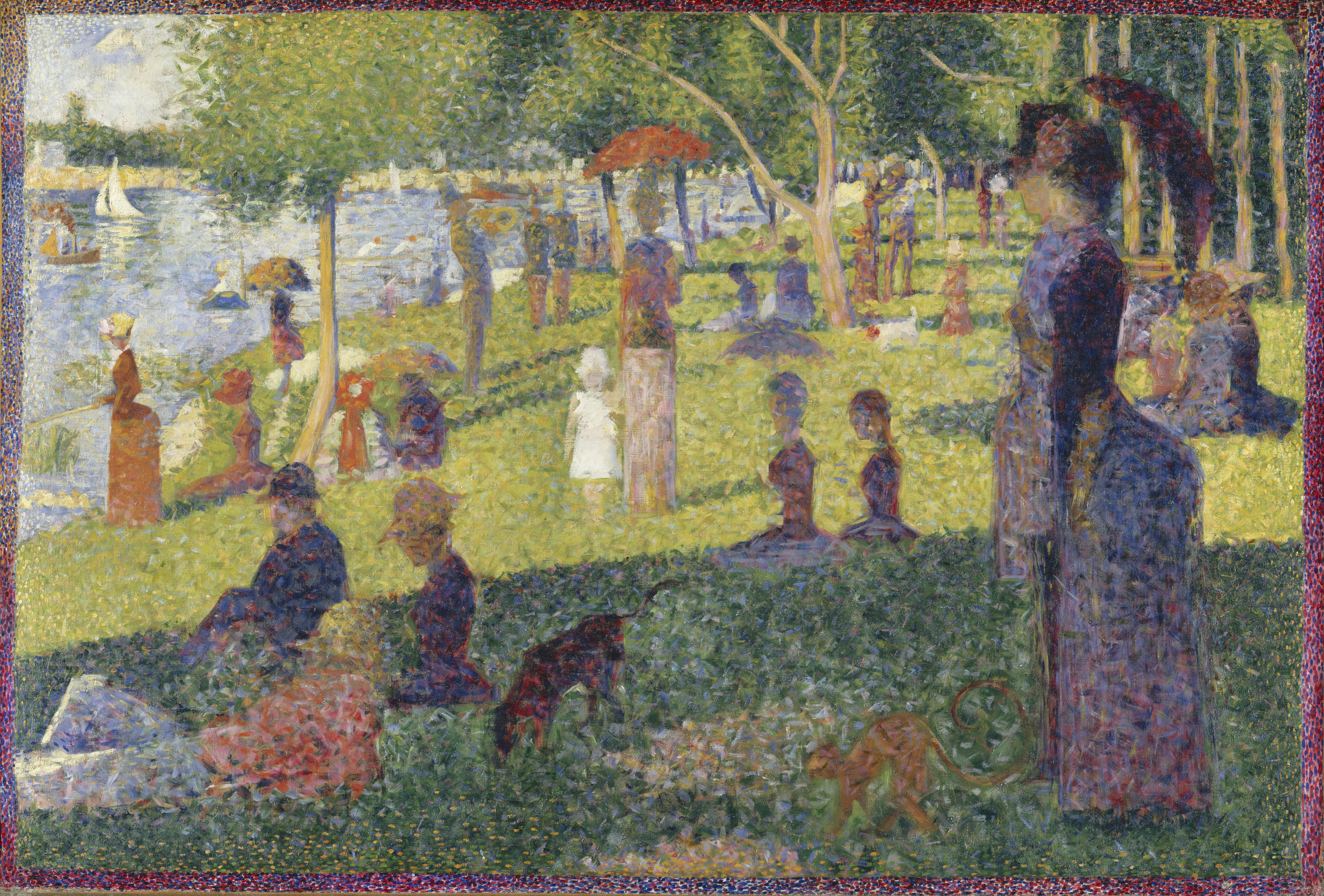
Georges Seurat, Study for "A Sunday Afternoon on La Grande Jatte", 1884, oil on canvas, 70.5 x 104.1 cm, Metropolitan Museum of Art, New York

Georges Seurat painted A Sunday Afternoon between May 1884 and March 1885, and from October 1885 to May 1886, focusing meticulously on the landscape of the park and concentrating on issues of colour, light, and form. The painting is approximately 2 by 3 metres (6.6 ft × 9.8 ft) in size. Seurat completed numerous preliminary drawings and oil sketches before completing his masterpiece. One complete painting, the study featured to the right, measures 27 3/4 x 41 in. (70.5 x 104.1 cm) and is on display in the Metropolitan Museum of Art.

Inspired by optical effects and perception inherent in the color theories of Michel Eugène Chevreul, Ogden Rood and others, Seurat adapted this scientific research to his painting. Seurat contrasted miniature dots or small brushstrokes of colors that when unified optically in the human eye were perceived as a single shade or hue. He believed that this form of painting, called Divisionism at the time (a term he preferred) but now known as Pointillism, would make the colors more brilliant and powerful than standard brushstrokes. The use of dots of almost uniform size came in the second year of his work on the painting, 1885–86.

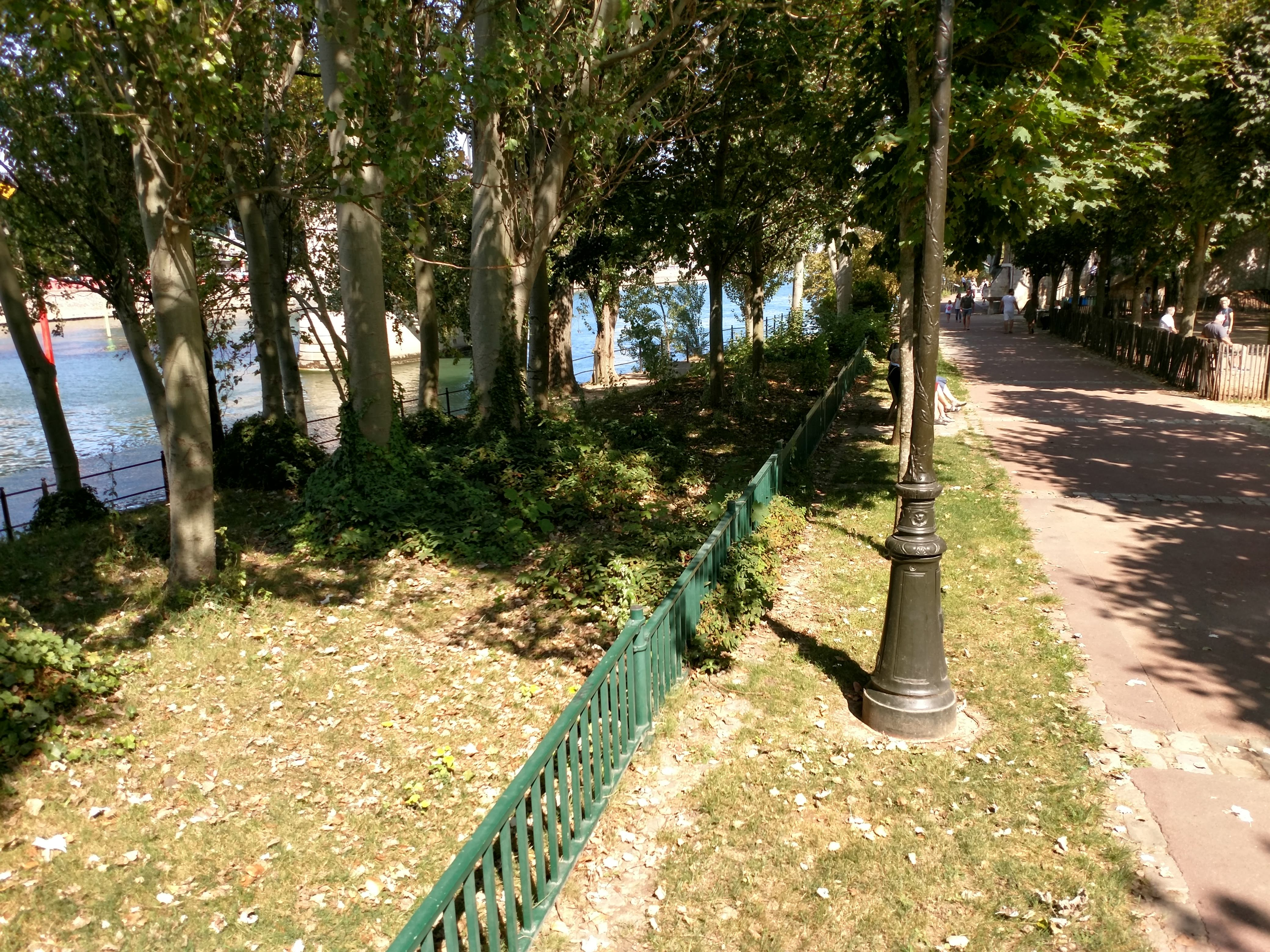
Northwest portion of La Grande Jatte in 2018

The Island of la Grande Jatte is located at the very gates of Paris, lying in the Seine between Neuilly and Levallois-Perret, a short distance from where La Défense business district currently stands. Although for many years it was an industrial site, it has become the site of a public garden and a housing development. When Seurat began the painting in 1884, the island was a bucolic retreat far from the urban center.

The painting was first exhibited at the eighth (and last) Impressionist exhibition in May 1886, then in August 1886, dominating the second Salon of the Société des Artistes Indépendants, of which Seurat had been a founder in 1884. Seurat was extremely disciplined, always serious, and private to the point of secretiveness—for the most part, steering his own steady course. As a painter, he wanted to make a difference in the history of art. With La Grande Jatte, Seurat was immediately acknowledged as the leader of a new and rebellious form of Impressionism called Neo-Impressionism.

La Grande Jatte was originally exhibited with a white frame, an unusual choice that reflected Seurat's embodying of new approaches. To make the experience of the painting even more vivid, in 1889 Seurat stretched the canvas, and at the painting's edge, surrounded it with a border of painted dots. In this way, the viewer would see a transition between the painting proper and the frame. The original exhibition frame at this point was likely abandoned, and Seurat died before a new outer frame could be constructed.

== Interpretation ==
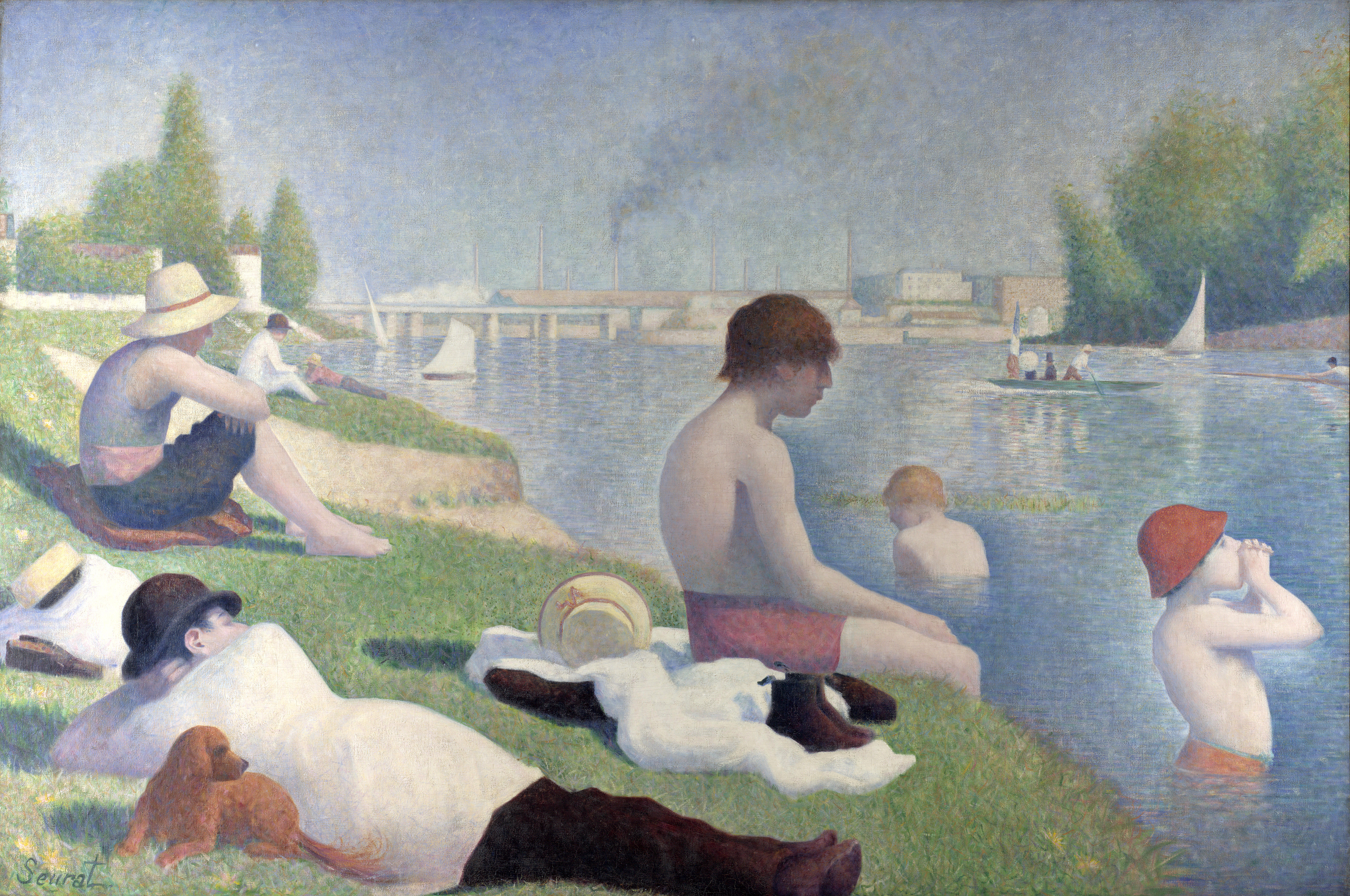
The left bank of working class Bathers at Asnières (1884) also by Seurat, mirrors the right bank of the bourgeoisie on La Grande Jatte.

Seurat's painting was a mirror impression of his own painting, Bathers at Asnières, completed shortly before, in 1884. Whereas the bathers in that earlier painting are doused in light, almost every figure on La Grande Jatte appears to be cast in the shadow, either under trees or an umbrella, or from another person. For Parisians, Sunday was the day to escape the heat of the city and head for the shade of the trees and the cool breezes that came off the river. And at first glance, the viewer sees many different people relaxing in a park by the river. On the right, a fashionable couple, the woman with the sunshade and the man in his top hat, are on a stroll. On the left, another woman who is also well dressed extends her fishing pole over the water. There is a small man with the black hat and thin cane looking at the river, and a white dog with a brown head, a woman knitting, a man playing a trumpet, two soldiers standing at attention as the musician plays, and a woman hunched under an orange umbrella. Seurat also painted a man with a pipe, a woman under a parasol in a boat filled with rowers, and a couple admiring their infant child.

Some of the characters are doing curious things. The lady on the right side has a pet monkey on a leash. A lady on the left near the river bank is fishing. The area was known at the time as being a place to procure prostitutes among the bourgeoisie, a likely allusion of the otherwise odd "fishing" rod. In the painting's center stands a little girl dressed in white (who is not in a shadow), who stares directly at the viewer of the painting. This may be interpreted as someone who is silently questioning the audience.

In the 1950s, historian and Marxist philosopher Ernst Bloch drew social and political significance from Seurat's La Grande Jatte. The historian's focal point was what he saw as Seurat's mechanical use of the figures and what their static nature said about French society at the time. Afterward, critique of the work often centered on the artist's presumed mathematical and robotic interpretation of the meaning of modernity in Paris.

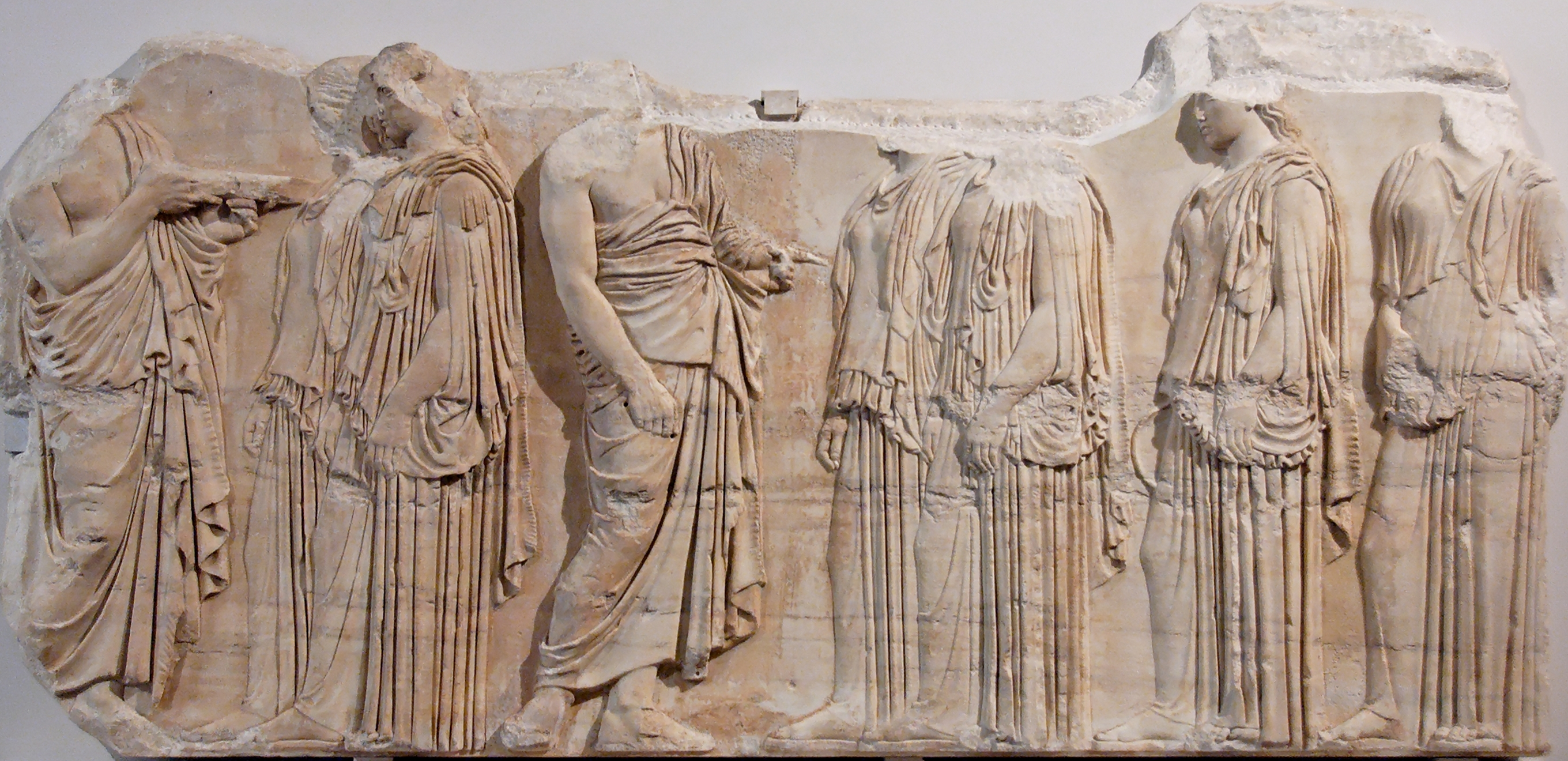
Part of the Parthenon Frieze Louvre MR825, with different figures of city life standing in profile

According to historian of Modernism William Everdell:

Seurat himself told a sympathetic critic, Gustave Kahn, that his model was the Panathenaic procession in the Parthenon frieze. But Seurat didn't want to paint ancient Athenians. He wanted 'to make the moderns file past ... in their essential form.' By 'moderns' he meant nothing very complicated. He wanted ordinary people as his subject, and ordinary life. He was a bit of a democrat—a "Communard", as one of his friends remarked, referring to the left-wing revolutionaries of 1871; and he was fascinated by the way things distinct and different encountered each other: the city and the country, the farm and the factory, the bourgeois and the proletarian meeting at their edges in a sort of harmony of opposites.

The border of the painting is, unusually, in inverted color, as if the world around them is also slowly inverting from the way of life they have known. Seen in this context, the boy who bathes on the other side of the river bank at Asnières appears to be calling out to them, as if to say, "We are the future. Come and join us".

== Painting materials ==
Seurat painted the La Grande Jatte in three distinct stages. In the first stage, which was started in 1884, he mixed his paints from several individual pigments and was still using dull earth pigments such as ochre or burnt sienna. In the second stage, during 1885 and 1886, Seurat dispensed with the earth pigments and also limited the number of individual pigments in his paints. This change in his palette was due to his application of the advanced color theories of his time. His intention was to paint small dots or strokes of pure color that would then mix on the retina of the beholder to achieve the desired color impression instead of the usual practice of mixing individual pigments.

Seurat's palette consisted of the usual pigments of his time such as cobalt blue, emerald green and vermilion. Additionally, he used the then new pigment zinc yellow (zinc chromate), predominantly for yellow highlights in the sunlit grass in the middle of the painting but also in mixtures with orange and blue pigments. In the century and more since the painting's completion, the zinc yellow has darkened to brown—a color degeneration that was already showing in the painting in Seurat's lifetime. The discoloration of the originally bright yellow zinc yellow (zinc chromate) to a brownish color is due to the chemical reaction of the chromate ions to orange-colored dichromate ions. In the third stage during 1888–89 Seurat added the colored borders to his composition.

The results of investigation into the discoloration of this painting have been combined with further research into natural aging of paints to digitally rejuvenate the painting.

== Acquisition by the Art Institute of Chicago ==
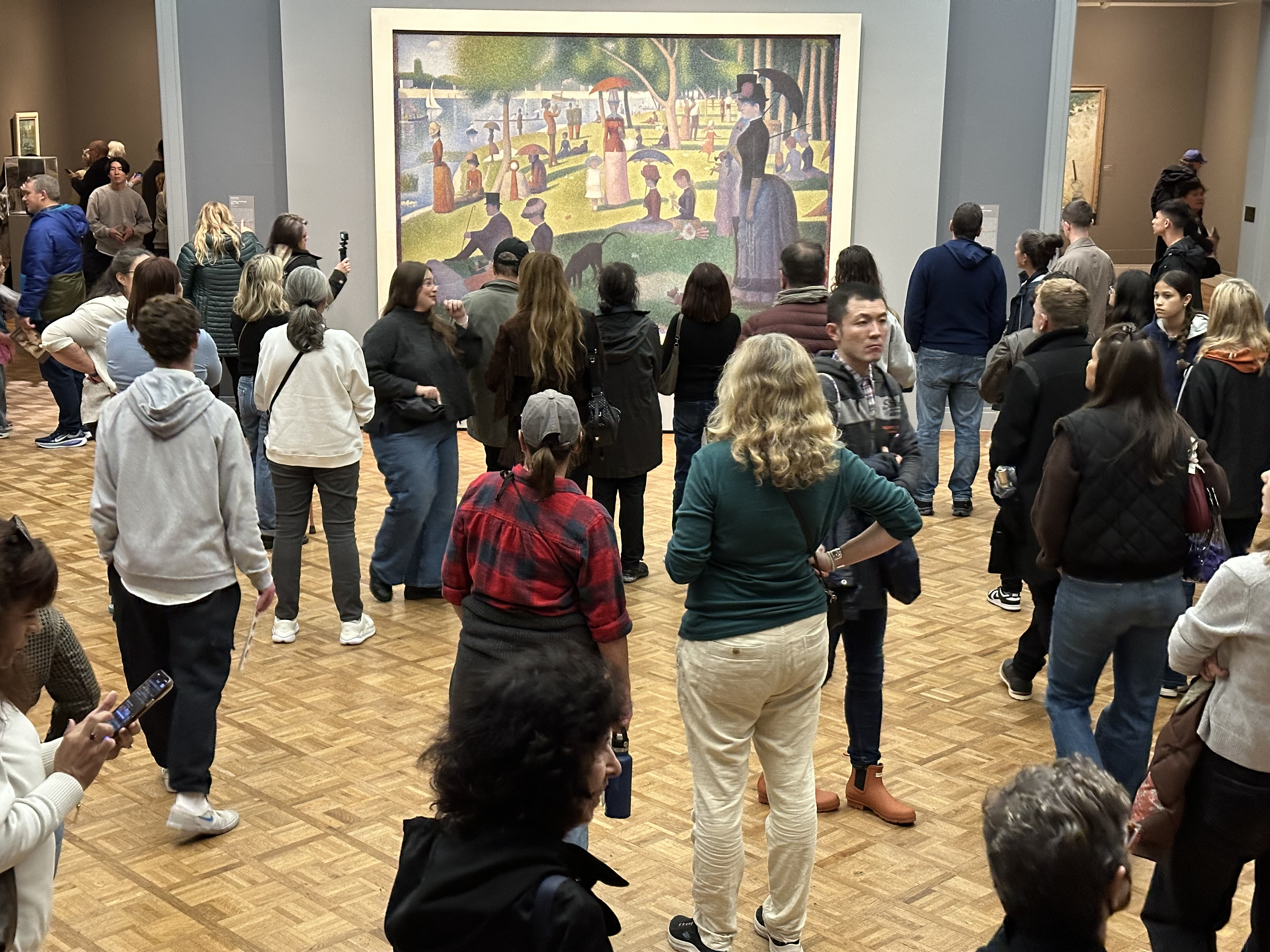
One of the most popular works at the Art Institute of Chicago, here with a semicircle of viewers in 2025

In 1923, Frederic Bartlett was appointed trustee of the Art Institute of Chicago. He and his second wife, Helen Birch Bartlett, loaned their collection of French Post-Impressionist and Modernist art to the museum. It was Mrs. Bartlett who had an interest in French and avant-garde artists and influenced her husband's collecting tastes. Sunday Afternoon on the Island of La Grande Jatte was purchased on the advice of the Art Institute of Chicago's curatorial staff in 1924.

In conceptual artist Don Celender's 1974–75 book Observation and Scholarship Examination for Art Historians, Museum Directors, Artists, Dealers and Collectors, it is claimed that the institute paid $24,000 for the work (over $354,000 in 2018 dollars).

In 1958, the painting was loaned for the only time, to the Museum of Modern Art in New York. On 15 April 1958, a fire there, which killed one person on the second floor of the museum, forced the emergency evacuation of the painting, which had been on a floor above the fire, to the Whitney Museum, which adjoined MoMA at the time.

Once at the institute, the painting was shown in a variety of framing styles and colors over the years. Then in 2022, a new frame was built that attempted to match as closely as possible what conservators felt was Seurat's most likely intent.

La Grande Jatte is one of the three or so most popular pieces at the Art Institute, and considered by the institute to be one of its "most iconic and beloved works".

== In popular culture ==
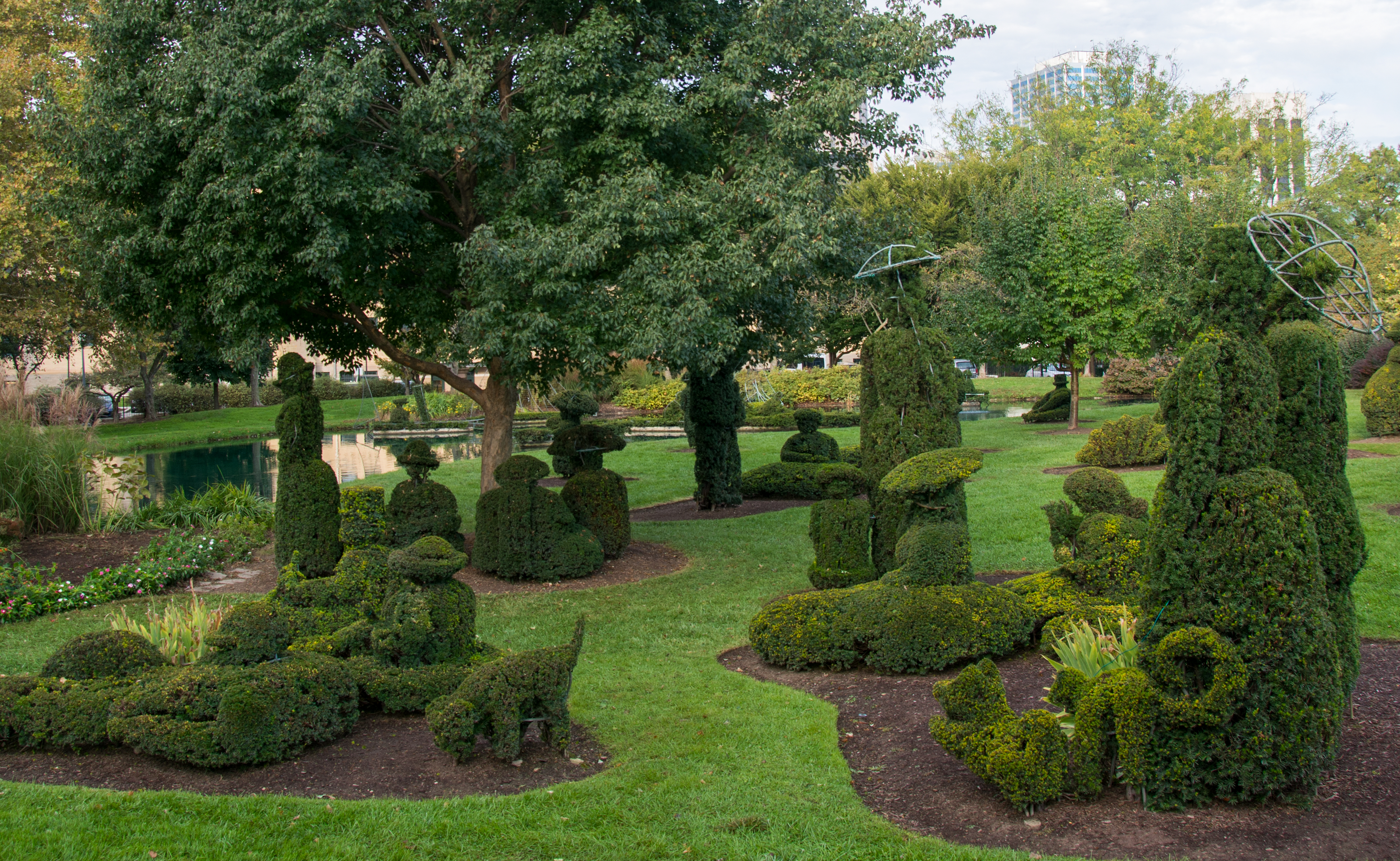
Topiary Park in Columbus, Ohio replicates much of the painting.

The painting is the basis for the 1984 Broadway musical Sunday in the Park with George by Stephen Sondheim and James Lapine, which tells a fictionalized story of the painting's creation. Subsequently, the painting is sometimes referred to by the misnomer "Sunday in the Park".

In Topiary Park (formerly Old Deaf School Park) in Columbus, Ohio, sculptor James T. Mason re-created the painting in topiary form; the installation was completed in 1989.

The 1986 John Hughes film Ferris Bueller's Day Off featured the painting during a scene at the Art Institute of Chicago.

This work was featured on 100 Great Paintings.

== Related works by Seurat ==
External videos
- Georges Seurat, A Sunday on La Grande Jatte – 1884, 1884–86, Smarthistory.

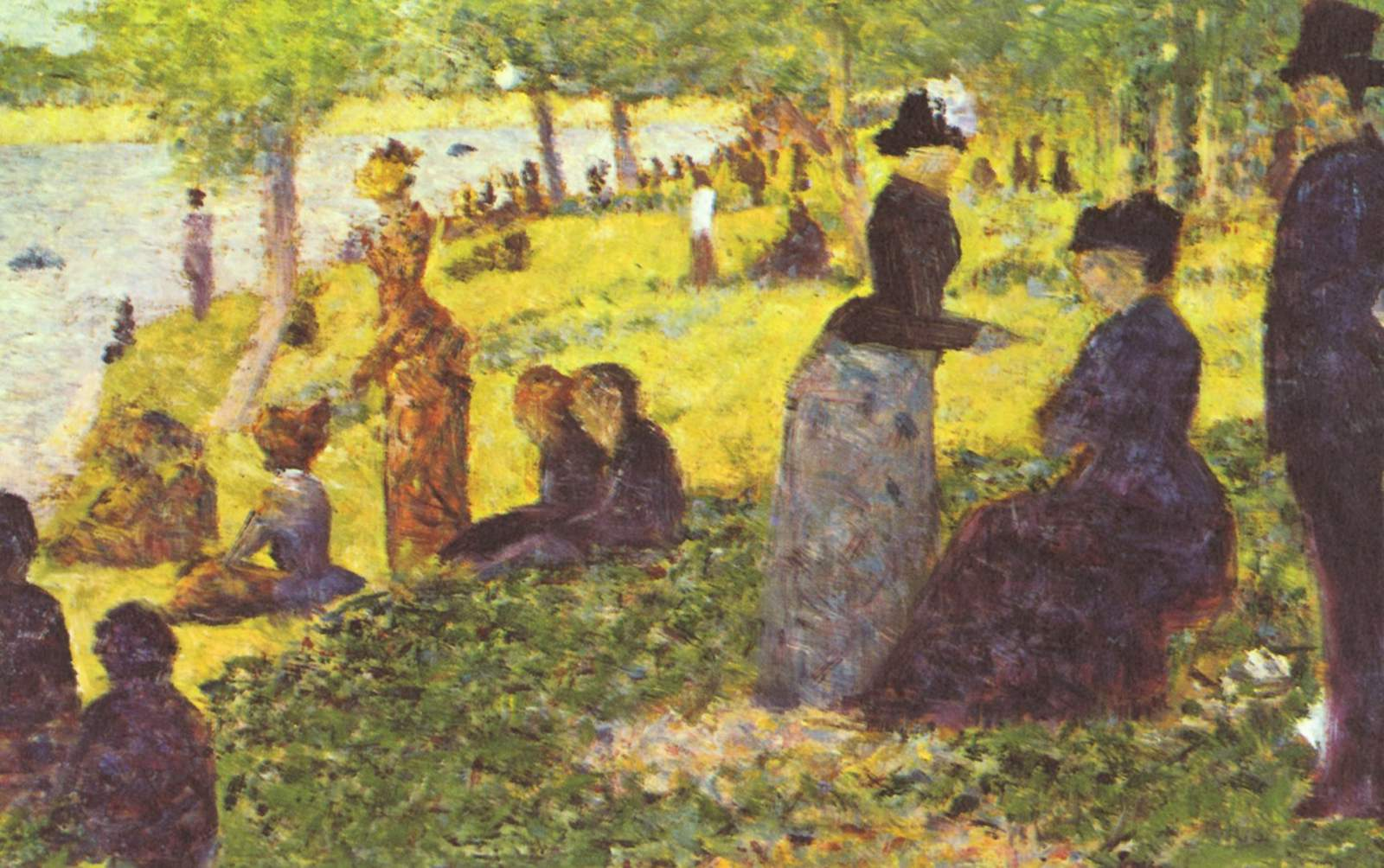
Die Insel La Grande Jatte mit Ausflüglern, 1884

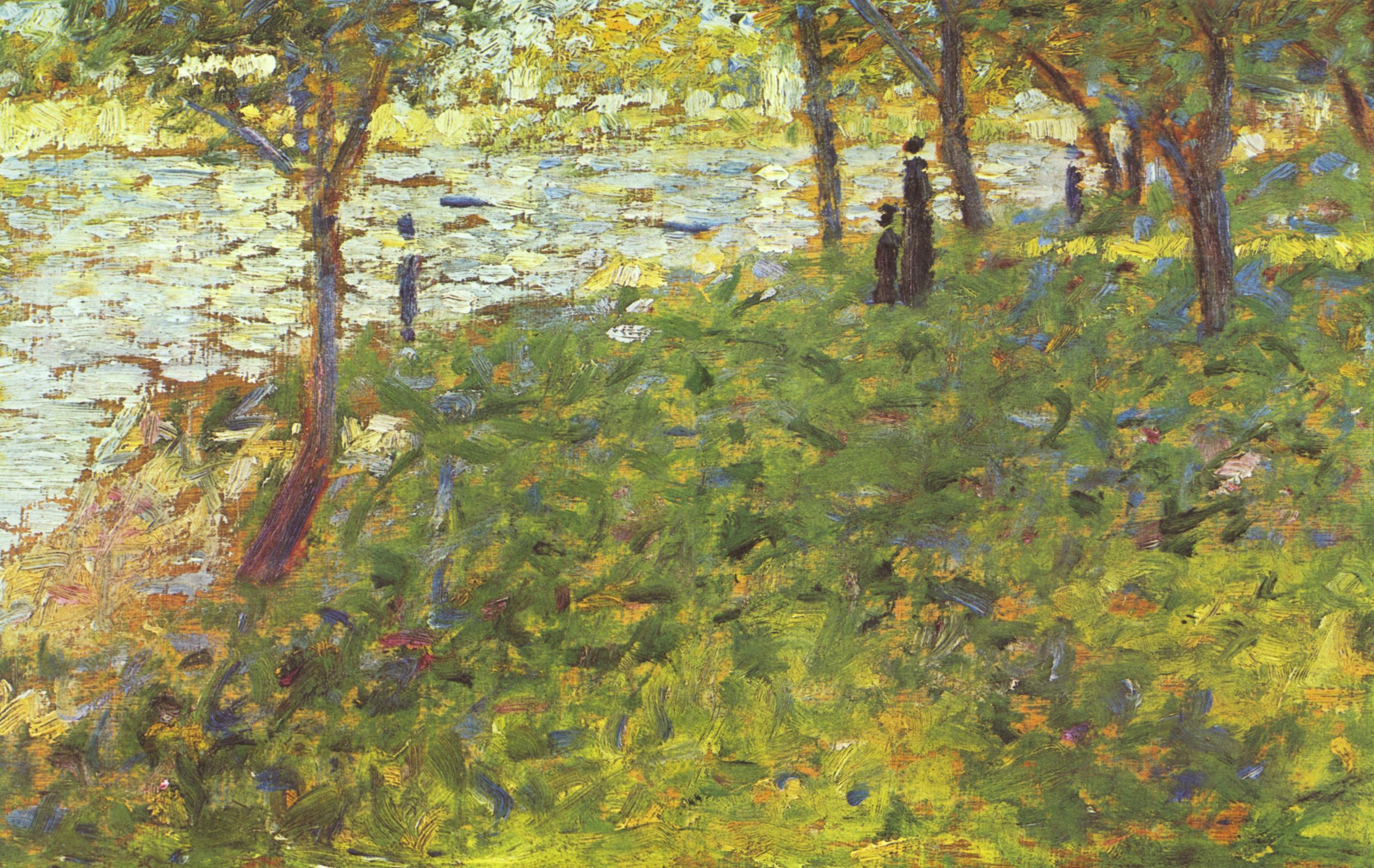
Paysage et personnages, 1884–85

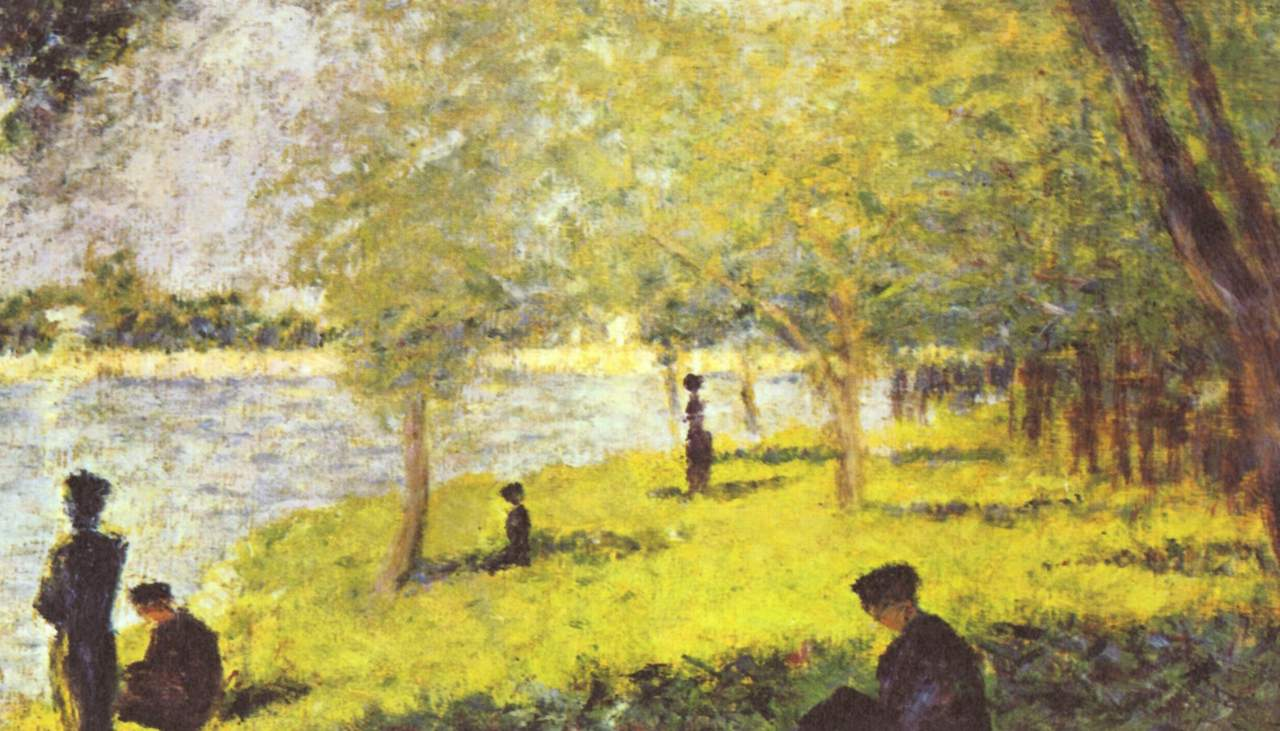
Groupe de personnages, 1884–85

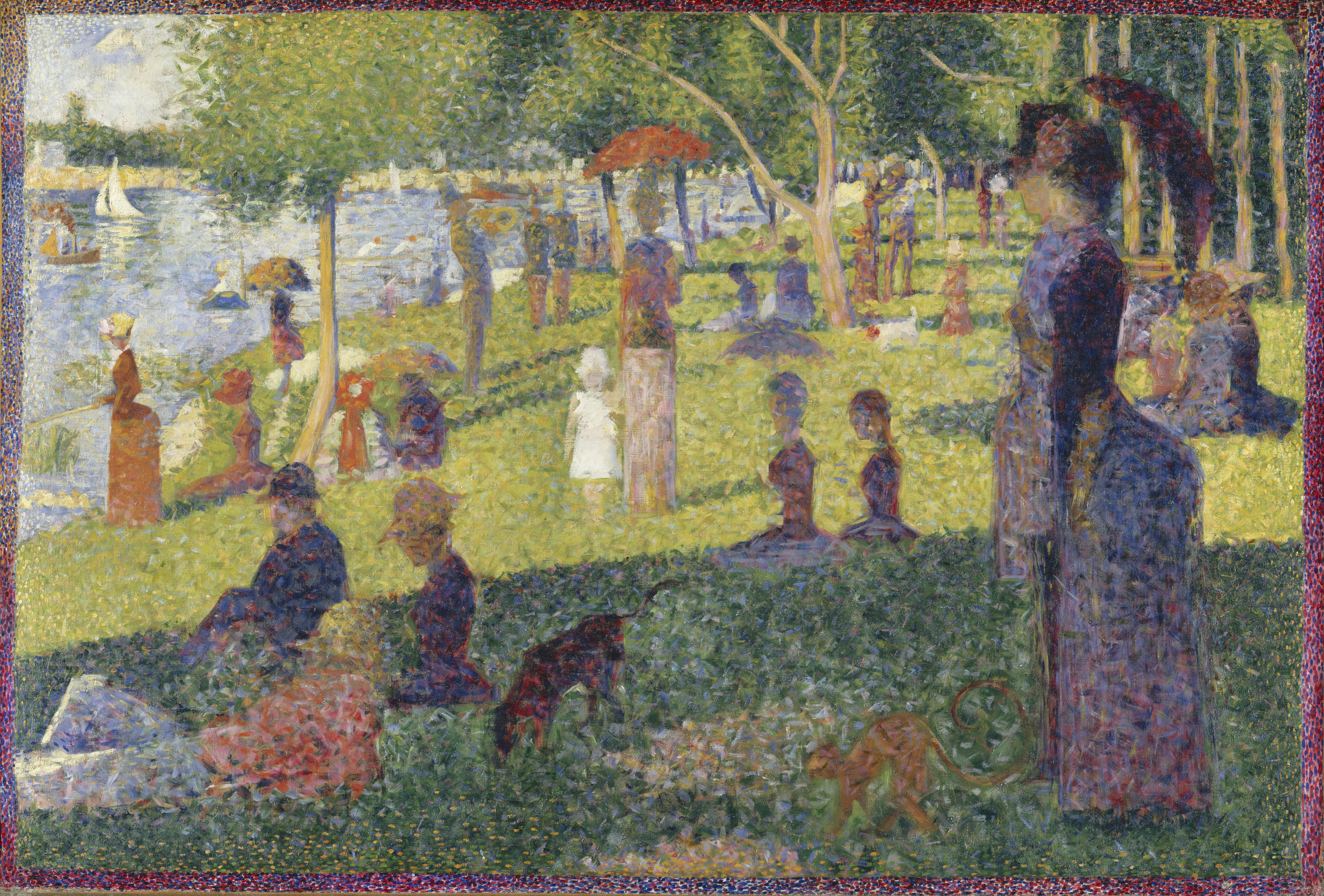
Esquisse d'ensemble, 1884–85

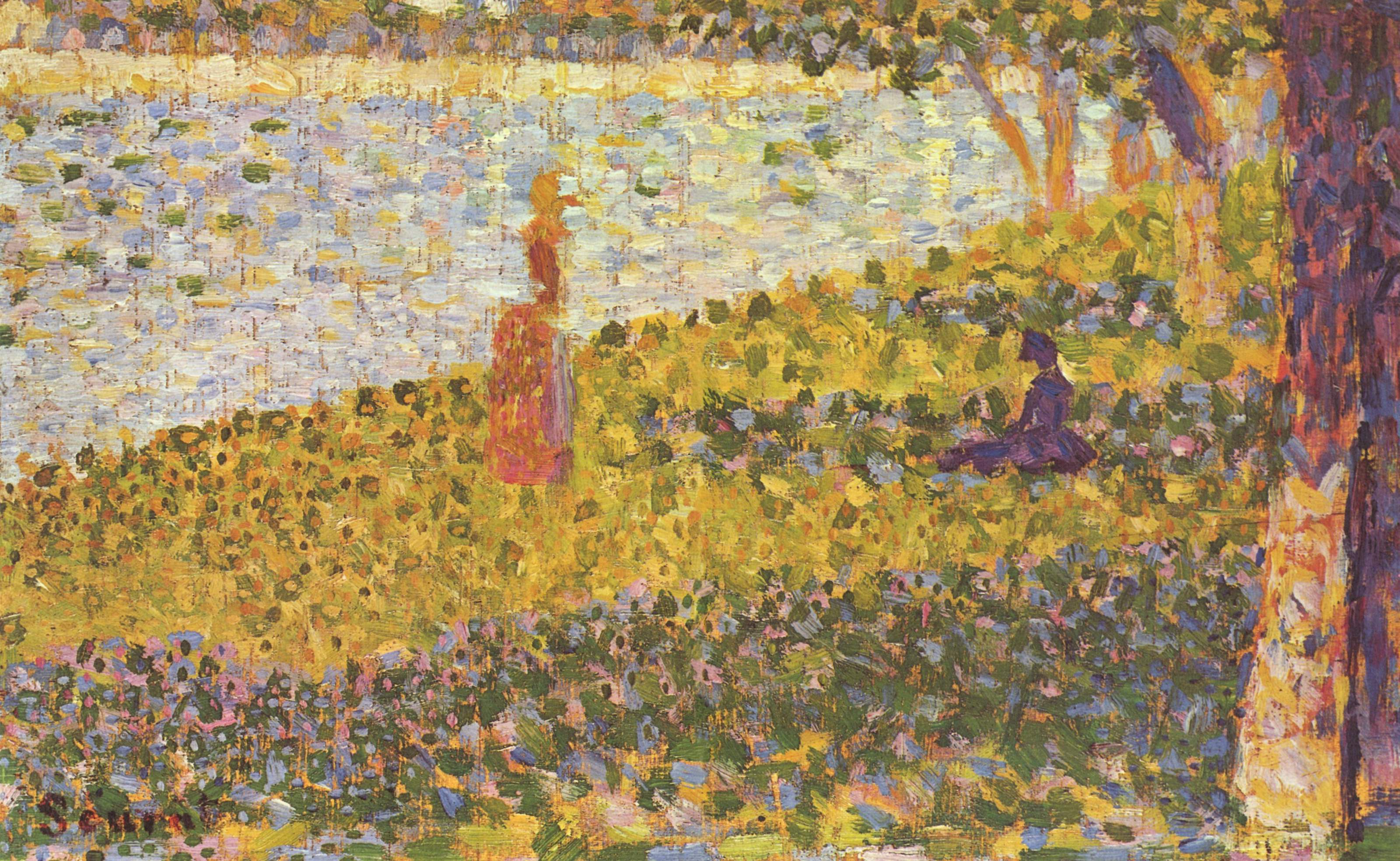
Femmes au bord de l'eau, 1885–86

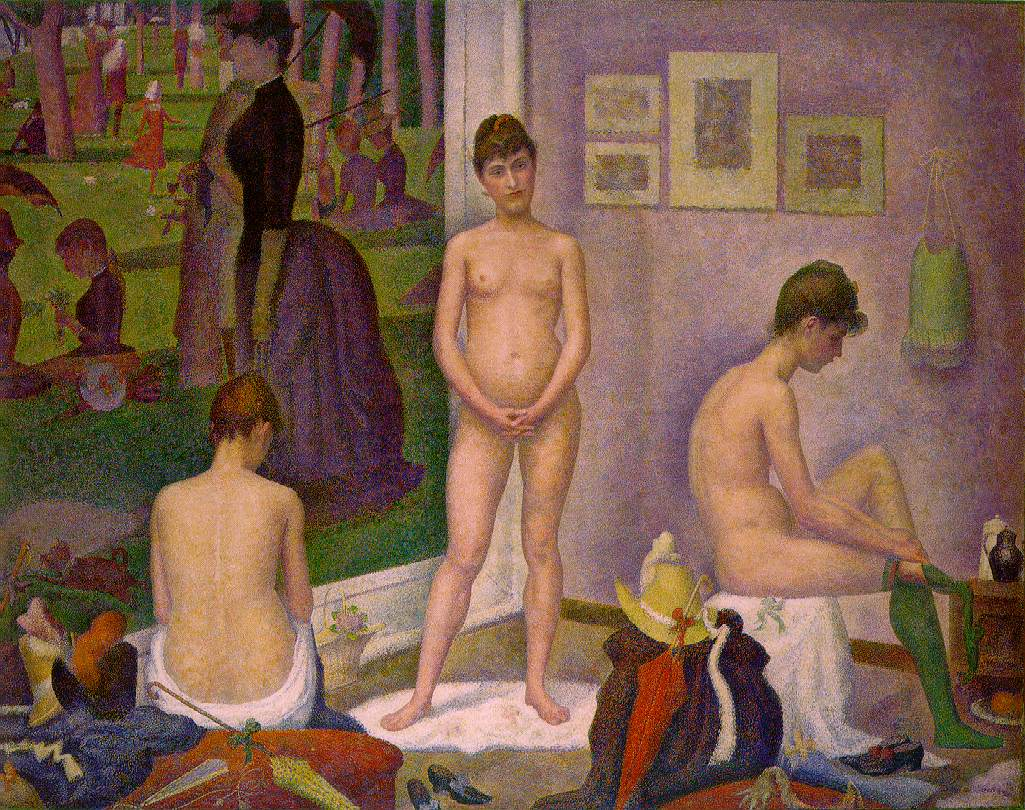
Models (Les Poseuses) 1886–1888 with La Grande Jatte in the backgound

== See also ==
- List of paintings by Georges Seurat
- 100 Great Paintings
